

237001–237100 

|-bgcolor=#d6d6d6
| 237001 ||  || — || September 2, 2008 || Kitt Peak || Spacewatch || CRO || align=right | 4.2 km || 
|-id=002 bgcolor=#E9E9E9
| 237002 ||  || — || September 6, 2008 || Mount Lemmon || Mount Lemmon Survey || — || align=right data-sort-value="0.98" | 980 m || 
|-id=003 bgcolor=#d6d6d6
| 237003 ||  || — || September 3, 2008 || Kitt Peak || Spacewatch || — || align=right | 4.0 km || 
|-id=004 bgcolor=#E9E9E9
| 237004 ||  || — || September 7, 2008 || Mount Lemmon || Mount Lemmon Survey || — || align=right | 3.8 km || 
|-id=005 bgcolor=#E9E9E9
| 237005 ||  || — || September 7, 2008 || Mount Lemmon || Mount Lemmon Survey || NEM || align=right | 2.6 km || 
|-id=006 bgcolor=#E9E9E9
| 237006 ||  || — || September 3, 2008 || Kitt Peak || Spacewatch || — || align=right | 2.3 km || 
|-id=007 bgcolor=#d6d6d6
| 237007 ||  || — || September 5, 2008 || Kitt Peak || Spacewatch || — || align=right | 3.9 km || 
|-id=008 bgcolor=#d6d6d6
| 237008 ||  || — || September 6, 2008 || Kitt Peak || Spacewatch || ALA || align=right | 6.5 km || 
|-id=009 bgcolor=#fefefe
| 237009 ||  || — || September 8, 2008 || Mount Lemmon || Mount Lemmon Survey || — || align=right | 1.2 km || 
|-id=010 bgcolor=#E9E9E9
| 237010 ||  || — || September 6, 2008 || Mount Lemmon || Mount Lemmon Survey || RAF || align=right data-sort-value="0.93" | 930 m || 
|-id=011 bgcolor=#E9E9E9
| 237011 ||  || — || September 10, 2008 || Kitt Peak || Spacewatch || — || align=right | 2.3 km || 
|-id=012 bgcolor=#fefefe
| 237012 ||  || — || September 9, 2008 || Junk Bond || D. Healy || CLA || align=right | 2.2 km || 
|-id=013 bgcolor=#E9E9E9
| 237013 ||  || — || September 9, 2008 || Mount Lemmon || Mount Lemmon Survey || — || align=right | 2.3 km || 
|-id=014 bgcolor=#fefefe
| 237014 ||  || — || September 4, 2008 || Kitt Peak || Spacewatch || — || align=right | 1.1 km || 
|-id=015 bgcolor=#E9E9E9
| 237015 ||  || — || September 22, 2008 || Goodricke-Pigott || R. A. Tucker || — || align=right | 3.0 km || 
|-id=016 bgcolor=#E9E9E9
| 237016 ||  || — || September 22, 2008 || Socorro || LINEAR || — || align=right | 4.0 km || 
|-id=017 bgcolor=#fefefe
| 237017 ||  || — || September 22, 2008 || Socorro || LINEAR || V || align=right data-sort-value="0.95" | 950 m || 
|-id=018 bgcolor=#E9E9E9
| 237018 ||  || — || September 19, 2008 || Kitt Peak || Spacewatch || — || align=right | 1.4 km || 
|-id=019 bgcolor=#fefefe
| 237019 ||  || — || September 19, 2008 || Kitt Peak || Spacewatch || NYS || align=right data-sort-value="0.89" | 890 m || 
|-id=020 bgcolor=#E9E9E9
| 237020 ||  || — || September 19, 2008 || Kitt Peak || Spacewatch || — || align=right | 3.0 km || 
|-id=021 bgcolor=#fefefe
| 237021 ||  || — || September 19, 2008 || Kitt Peak || Spacewatch || — || align=right data-sort-value="0.81" | 810 m || 
|-id=022 bgcolor=#E9E9E9
| 237022 ||  || — || September 20, 2008 || Kitt Peak || Spacewatch || — || align=right | 1.6 km || 
|-id=023 bgcolor=#d6d6d6
| 237023 ||  || — || September 20, 2008 || Kitt Peak || Spacewatch || — || align=right | 2.9 km || 
|-id=024 bgcolor=#E9E9E9
| 237024 ||  || — || September 20, 2008 || Kitt Peak || Spacewatch || — || align=right | 2.0 km || 
|-id=025 bgcolor=#C2FFFF
| 237025 ||  || — || September 20, 2008 || Kitt Peak || Spacewatch || L4 || align=right | 12 km || 
|-id=026 bgcolor=#E9E9E9
| 237026 ||  || — || September 20, 2008 || Kitt Peak || Spacewatch || — || align=right | 2.1 km || 
|-id=027 bgcolor=#fefefe
| 237027 ||  || — || September 21, 2008 || Kitt Peak || Spacewatch || — || align=right data-sort-value="0.77" | 770 m || 
|-id=028 bgcolor=#E9E9E9
| 237028 ||  || — || September 21, 2008 || Mount Lemmon || Mount Lemmon Survey || — || align=right | 2.9 km || 
|-id=029 bgcolor=#E9E9E9
| 237029 ||  || — || September 21, 2008 || Kitt Peak || Spacewatch || — || align=right | 1.1 km || 
|-id=030 bgcolor=#E9E9E9
| 237030 ||  || — || September 21, 2008 || Catalina || CSS || — || align=right | 2.8 km || 
|-id=031 bgcolor=#E9E9E9
| 237031 ||  || — || September 22, 2008 || Kitt Peak || Spacewatch || — || align=right | 1.7 km || 
|-id=032 bgcolor=#E9E9E9
| 237032 ||  || — || September 22, 2008 || Mount Lemmon || Mount Lemmon Survey || RAF || align=right | 1.8 km || 
|-id=033 bgcolor=#E9E9E9
| 237033 ||  || — || September 23, 2008 || Catalina || CSS || RAF || align=right | 1.5 km || 
|-id=034 bgcolor=#fefefe
| 237034 ||  || — || September 19, 2008 || Kitt Peak || Spacewatch || FLO || align=right data-sort-value="0.77" | 770 m || 
|-id=035 bgcolor=#C2FFFF
| 237035 ||  || — || September 21, 2008 || Kitt Peak || Spacewatch || L4ERY || align=right | 12 km || 
|-id=036 bgcolor=#fefefe
| 237036 ||  || — || September 21, 2008 || Kitt Peak || Spacewatch || — || align=right | 1.0 km || 
|-id=037 bgcolor=#d6d6d6
| 237037 ||  || — || September 21, 2008 || Kitt Peak || Spacewatch || — || align=right | 3.7 km || 
|-id=038 bgcolor=#E9E9E9
| 237038 ||  || — || September 21, 2008 || Kitt Peak || Spacewatch || — || align=right | 1.9 km || 
|-id=039 bgcolor=#E9E9E9
| 237039 ||  || — || September 21, 2008 || Kitt Peak || Spacewatch || AST || align=right | 2.3 km || 
|-id=040 bgcolor=#d6d6d6
| 237040 ||  || — || September 22, 2008 || Kitt Peak || Spacewatch || — || align=right | 2.3 km || 
|-id=041 bgcolor=#fefefe
| 237041 ||  || — || September 22, 2008 || Mount Lemmon || Mount Lemmon Survey || — || align=right data-sort-value="0.95" | 950 m || 
|-id=042 bgcolor=#E9E9E9
| 237042 ||  || — || September 22, 2008 || Mount Lemmon || Mount Lemmon Survey || — || align=right | 1.8 km || 
|-id=043 bgcolor=#fefefe
| 237043 ||  || — || September 22, 2008 || Mount Lemmon || Mount Lemmon Survey || — || align=right data-sort-value="0.84" | 840 m || 
|-id=044 bgcolor=#fefefe
| 237044 ||  || — || September 22, 2008 || Mount Lemmon || Mount Lemmon Survey || — || align=right | 1.2 km || 
|-id=045 bgcolor=#d6d6d6
| 237045 ||  || — || September 22, 2008 || Mount Lemmon || Mount Lemmon Survey || KOR || align=right | 1.4 km || 
|-id=046 bgcolor=#E9E9E9
| 237046 ||  || — || September 22, 2008 || Mount Lemmon || Mount Lemmon Survey || — || align=right | 1.00 km || 
|-id=047 bgcolor=#d6d6d6
| 237047 ||  || — || September 22, 2008 || Mount Lemmon || Mount Lemmon Survey || — || align=right | 2.8 km || 
|-id=048 bgcolor=#E9E9E9
| 237048 ||  || — || September 22, 2008 || Mount Lemmon || Mount Lemmon Survey || JUN || align=right | 1.7 km || 
|-id=049 bgcolor=#fefefe
| 237049 ||  || — || September 22, 2008 || Kitt Peak || Spacewatch || — || align=right | 1.1 km || 
|-id=050 bgcolor=#E9E9E9
| 237050 ||  || — || September 22, 2008 || Kitt Peak || Spacewatch || — || align=right | 3.3 km || 
|-id=051 bgcolor=#E9E9E9
| 237051 ||  || — || September 22, 2008 || Kitt Peak || Spacewatch || — || align=right | 2.9 km || 
|-id=052 bgcolor=#fefefe
| 237052 ||  || — || September 23, 2008 || Mount Lemmon || Mount Lemmon Survey || — || align=right data-sort-value="0.98" | 980 m || 
|-id=053 bgcolor=#d6d6d6
| 237053 ||  || — || September 28, 2008 || Sandlot || G. Hug || 3:2 || align=right | 7.5 km || 
|-id=054 bgcolor=#E9E9E9
| 237054 ||  || — || September 29, 2008 || Dauban || F. Kugel || — || align=right | 2.4 km || 
|-id=055 bgcolor=#fefefe
| 237055 ||  || — || September 24, 2008 || Socorro || LINEAR || — || align=right | 1.1 km || 
|-id=056 bgcolor=#E9E9E9
| 237056 ||  || — || September 24, 2008 || Socorro || LINEAR || — || align=right | 2.9 km || 
|-id=057 bgcolor=#fefefe
| 237057 ||  || — || September 24, 2008 || Socorro || LINEAR || — || align=right data-sort-value="0.76" | 760 m || 
|-id=058 bgcolor=#fefefe
| 237058 ||  || — || September 28, 2008 || Socorro || LINEAR || — || align=right | 1.1 km || 
|-id=059 bgcolor=#E9E9E9
| 237059 ||  || — || September 28, 2008 || Socorro || LINEAR || GEF || align=right | 2.0 km || 
|-id=060 bgcolor=#E9E9E9
| 237060 ||  || — || September 24, 2008 || Mount Lemmon || Mount Lemmon Survey || — || align=right | 1.8 km || 
|-id=061 bgcolor=#E9E9E9
| 237061 ||  || — || September 25, 2008 || Kitt Peak || Spacewatch || CLO || align=right | 2.4 km || 
|-id=062 bgcolor=#E9E9E9
| 237062 ||  || — || September 25, 2008 || Kitt Peak || Spacewatch || — || align=right | 1.9 km || 
|-id=063 bgcolor=#E9E9E9
| 237063 ||  || — || September 25, 2008 || Kitt Peak || Spacewatch || — || align=right | 2.0 km || 
|-id=064 bgcolor=#E9E9E9
| 237064 ||  || — || September 26, 2008 || Kitt Peak || Spacewatch || EUN || align=right | 1.5 km || 
|-id=065 bgcolor=#E9E9E9
| 237065 ||  || — || September 26, 2008 || Kitt Peak || Spacewatch || — || align=right | 2.0 km || 
|-id=066 bgcolor=#E9E9E9
| 237066 ||  || — || September 26, 2008 || Kitt Peak || Spacewatch || — || align=right | 2.7 km || 
|-id=067 bgcolor=#E9E9E9
| 237067 ||  || — || September 27, 2008 || Mount Lemmon || Mount Lemmon Survey || HEN || align=right | 1.2 km || 
|-id=068 bgcolor=#fefefe
| 237068 ||  || — || September 28, 2008 || Kitt Peak || Spacewatch || V || align=right data-sort-value="0.88" | 880 m || 
|-id=069 bgcolor=#E9E9E9
| 237069 ||  || — || September 26, 2008 || Kitt Peak || Spacewatch || DOR || align=right | 3.5 km || 
|-id=070 bgcolor=#E9E9E9
| 237070 ||  || — || September 30, 2008 || La Sagra || OAM Obs. || — || align=right | 1.2 km || 
|-id=071 bgcolor=#E9E9E9
| 237071 ||  || — || September 30, 2008 || La Sagra || OAM Obs. || — || align=right data-sort-value="0.90" | 900 m || 
|-id=072 bgcolor=#E9E9E9
| 237072 ||  || — || September 26, 2008 || Kitt Peak || Spacewatch || — || align=right | 3.2 km || 
|-id=073 bgcolor=#fefefe
| 237073 ||  || — || September 22, 2008 || Kitt Peak || Spacewatch || FLO || align=right data-sort-value="0.65" | 650 m || 
|-id=074 bgcolor=#E9E9E9
| 237074 ||  || — || September 23, 2008 || Kitt Peak || Spacewatch || — || align=right | 2.1 km || 
|-id=075 bgcolor=#E9E9E9
| 237075 ||  || — || September 23, 2008 || Kitt Peak || Spacewatch || — || align=right | 2.7 km || 
|-id=076 bgcolor=#E9E9E9
| 237076 ||  || — || September 24, 2008 || Mount Lemmon || Mount Lemmon Survey || — || align=right | 2.7 km || 
|-id=077 bgcolor=#d6d6d6
| 237077 ||  || — || September 24, 2008 || Kitt Peak || Spacewatch || — || align=right | 4.4 km || 
|-id=078 bgcolor=#d6d6d6
| 237078 ||  || — || September 27, 2008 || Mount Lemmon || Mount Lemmon Survey || — || align=right | 3.2 km || 
|-id=079 bgcolor=#E9E9E9
| 237079 ||  || — || September 24, 2008 || Catalina || CSS || HNS || align=right | 1.8 km || 
|-id=080 bgcolor=#E9E9E9
| 237080 ||  || — || September 23, 2008 || Goodricke-Pigott || R. A. Tucker || — || align=right | 2.4 km || 
|-id=081 bgcolor=#E9E9E9
| 237081 ||  || — || September 29, 2008 || Catalina || CSS || — || align=right | 1.4 km || 
|-id=082 bgcolor=#fefefe
| 237082 ||  || — || September 20, 2008 || Mount Lemmon || Mount Lemmon Survey || — || align=right data-sort-value="0.93" | 930 m || 
|-id=083 bgcolor=#E9E9E9
| 237083 ||  || — || September 22, 2008 || Kitt Peak || Spacewatch || — || align=right | 1.7 km || 
|-id=084 bgcolor=#d6d6d6
| 237084 ||  || — || September 23, 2008 || Catalina || CSS || — || align=right | 5.0 km || 
|-id=085 bgcolor=#E9E9E9
| 237085 ||  || — || September 23, 2008 || Socorro || LINEAR || — || align=right | 2.0 km || 
|-id=086 bgcolor=#E9E9E9
| 237086 ||  || — || September 22, 2008 || Mount Lemmon || Mount Lemmon Survey || — || align=right | 1.1 km || 
|-id=087 bgcolor=#fefefe
| 237087 ||  || — || October 2, 2008 || Sandlot || G. Hug || — || align=right | 1.0 km || 
|-id=088 bgcolor=#FA8072
| 237088 ||  || — || October 4, 2008 || La Sagra || OAM Obs. || — || align=right | 1.6 km || 
|-id=089 bgcolor=#fefefe
| 237089 ||  || — || October 3, 2008 || La Sagra || OAM Obs. || — || align=right data-sort-value="0.79" | 790 m || 
|-id=090 bgcolor=#E9E9E9
| 237090 ||  || — || October 1, 2008 || Mount Lemmon || Mount Lemmon Survey || NEM || align=right | 2.9 km || 
|-id=091 bgcolor=#fefefe
| 237091 ||  || — || October 1, 2008 || Mount Lemmon || Mount Lemmon Survey || — || align=right | 1.7 km || 
|-id=092 bgcolor=#d6d6d6
| 237092 ||  || — || October 1, 2008 || Mount Lemmon || Mount Lemmon Survey || CHA || align=right | 2.4 km || 
|-id=093 bgcolor=#E9E9E9
| 237093 ||  || — || October 2, 2008 || Catalina || CSS || — || align=right | 1.7 km || 
|-id=094 bgcolor=#fefefe
| 237094 ||  || — || October 8, 2008 || Kachina || J. Hobart || — || align=right data-sort-value="0.93" | 930 m || 
|-id=095 bgcolor=#E9E9E9
| 237095 ||  || — || October 1, 2008 || Catalina || CSS || JUN || align=right | 1.8 km || 
|-id=096 bgcolor=#E9E9E9
| 237096 ||  || — || October 1, 2008 || Mount Lemmon || Mount Lemmon Survey || — || align=right | 1.9 km || 
|-id=097 bgcolor=#E9E9E9
| 237097 ||  || — || October 1, 2008 || Mount Lemmon || Mount Lemmon Survey || — || align=right | 3.4 km || 
|-id=098 bgcolor=#d6d6d6
| 237098 ||  || — || October 1, 2008 || Kitt Peak || Spacewatch || — || align=right | 6.1 km || 
|-id=099 bgcolor=#E9E9E9
| 237099 ||  || — || October 2, 2008 || Kitt Peak || Spacewatch || HEN || align=right | 1.4 km || 
|-id=100 bgcolor=#E9E9E9
| 237100 ||  || — || October 2, 2008 || Kitt Peak || Spacewatch || EUN || align=right | 2.0 km || 
|}

237101–237200 

|-bgcolor=#fefefe
| 237101 ||  || — || October 2, 2008 || Mount Lemmon || Mount Lemmon Survey || — || align=right data-sort-value="0.91" | 910 m || 
|-id=102 bgcolor=#E9E9E9
| 237102 ||  || — || October 3, 2008 || Mount Lemmon || Mount Lemmon Survey || — || align=right | 4.1 km || 
|-id=103 bgcolor=#E9E9E9
| 237103 ||  || — || October 4, 2008 || La Sagra || OAM Obs. || — || align=right | 1.4 km || 
|-id=104 bgcolor=#E9E9E9
| 237104 ||  || — || October 6, 2008 || Kitt Peak || Spacewatch || — || align=right | 1.5 km || 
|-id=105 bgcolor=#E9E9E9
| 237105 ||  || — || October 6, 2008 || Kitt Peak || Spacewatch || — || align=right | 1.7 km || 
|-id=106 bgcolor=#E9E9E9
| 237106 ||  || — || October 6, 2008 || Kitt Peak || Spacewatch || — || align=right data-sort-value="0.83" | 830 m || 
|-id=107 bgcolor=#fefefe
| 237107 ||  || — || October 6, 2008 || Kitt Peak || Spacewatch || FLO || align=right data-sort-value="0.57" | 570 m || 
|-id=108 bgcolor=#fefefe
| 237108 ||  || — || October 6, 2008 || Kitt Peak || Spacewatch || — || align=right data-sort-value="0.99" | 990 m || 
|-id=109 bgcolor=#E9E9E9
| 237109 ||  || — || October 7, 2008 || Mount Lemmon || Mount Lemmon Survey || MRX || align=right | 1.7 km || 
|-id=110 bgcolor=#E9E9E9
| 237110 ||  || — || October 8, 2008 || Mount Lemmon || Mount Lemmon Survey || — || align=right | 3.4 km || 
|-id=111 bgcolor=#fefefe
| 237111 ||  || — || October 8, 2008 || Mount Lemmon || Mount Lemmon Survey || V || align=right data-sort-value="0.73" | 730 m || 
|-id=112 bgcolor=#d6d6d6
| 237112 ||  || — || October 8, 2008 || Mount Lemmon || Mount Lemmon Survey || HYG || align=right | 3.3 km || 
|-id=113 bgcolor=#fefefe
| 237113 ||  || — || October 9, 2008 || Mount Lemmon || Mount Lemmon Survey || — || align=right | 1.2 km || 
|-id=114 bgcolor=#E9E9E9
| 237114 ||  || — || October 4, 2008 || La Sagra || OAM Obs. || MAR || align=right | 2.3 km || 
|-id=115 bgcolor=#E9E9E9
| 237115 ||  || — || October 1, 2008 || Catalina || CSS || — || align=right | 3.1 km || 
|-id=116 bgcolor=#d6d6d6
| 237116 ||  || — || October 1, 2008 || Kitt Peak || Spacewatch || — || align=right | 2.9 km || 
|-id=117 bgcolor=#E9E9E9
| 237117 ||  || — || October 9, 2008 || Mount Lemmon || Mount Lemmon Survey || — || align=right | 2.5 km || 
|-id=118 bgcolor=#E9E9E9
| 237118 ||  || — || October 9, 2008 || Catalina || CSS || — || align=right | 3.2 km || 
|-id=119 bgcolor=#d6d6d6
| 237119 ||  || — || October 9, 2008 || Catalina || CSS || — || align=right | 3.9 km || 
|-id=120 bgcolor=#E9E9E9
| 237120 ||  || — || October 9, 2008 || Catalina || CSS || HNS || align=right | 1.7 km || 
|-id=121 bgcolor=#E9E9E9
| 237121 ||  || — || October 7, 2008 || Mount Lemmon || Mount Lemmon Survey || — || align=right | 2.6 km || 
|-id=122 bgcolor=#E9E9E9
| 237122 ||  || — || October 7, 2008 || Mount Lemmon || Mount Lemmon Survey || — || align=right | 2.3 km || 
|-id=123 bgcolor=#fefefe
| 237123 ||  || — || October 10, 2008 || Mount Lemmon || Mount Lemmon Survey || V || align=right data-sort-value="0.95" | 950 m || 
|-id=124 bgcolor=#E9E9E9
| 237124 ||  || — || October 6, 2008 || Mount Lemmon || Mount Lemmon Survey || — || align=right | 3.5 km || 
|-id=125 bgcolor=#E9E9E9
| 237125 ||  || — || October 21, 2008 || Sierra Stars || F. Tozzi || — || align=right | 2.8 km || 
|-id=126 bgcolor=#E9E9E9
| 237126 ||  || — || October 24, 2008 || Socorro || LINEAR || — || align=right | 2.0 km || 
|-id=127 bgcolor=#E9E9E9
| 237127 ||  || — || October 24, 2008 || Socorro || LINEAR || — || align=right | 3.1 km || 
|-id=128 bgcolor=#d6d6d6
| 237128 ||  || — || October 24, 2008 || Socorro || LINEAR || — || align=right | 6.3 km || 
|-id=129 bgcolor=#d6d6d6
| 237129 ||  || — || October 20, 2008 || Kitt Peak || Spacewatch || — || align=right | 2.8 km || 
|-id=130 bgcolor=#fefefe
| 237130 ||  || — || October 17, 2008 || Kitt Peak || Spacewatch || — || align=right data-sort-value="0.76" | 760 m || 
|-id=131 bgcolor=#fefefe
| 237131 ||  || — || October 18, 2008 || Kitt Peak || Spacewatch || — || align=right data-sort-value="0.83" | 830 m || 
|-id=132 bgcolor=#d6d6d6
| 237132 ||  || — || October 20, 2008 || Kitt Peak || Spacewatch || K-2 || align=right | 1.4 km || 
|-id=133 bgcolor=#fefefe
| 237133 ||  || — || October 20, 2008 || Kitt Peak || Spacewatch || — || align=right data-sort-value="0.92" | 920 m || 
|-id=134 bgcolor=#E9E9E9
| 237134 ||  || — || October 20, 2008 || Kitt Peak || Spacewatch || HEN || align=right | 1.2 km || 
|-id=135 bgcolor=#E9E9E9
| 237135 ||  || — || October 20, 2008 || Kitt Peak || Spacewatch || — || align=right | 2.2 km || 
|-id=136 bgcolor=#d6d6d6
| 237136 ||  || — || October 20, 2008 || Kitt Peak || Spacewatch || — || align=right | 3.2 km || 
|-id=137 bgcolor=#d6d6d6
| 237137 ||  || — || October 20, 2008 || Kitt Peak || Spacewatch || — || align=right | 2.9 km || 
|-id=138 bgcolor=#fefefe
| 237138 ||  || — || October 20, 2008 || Kitt Peak || Spacewatch || — || align=right | 1.3 km || 
|-id=139 bgcolor=#fefefe
| 237139 ||  || — || October 21, 2008 || Kitt Peak || Spacewatch || FLO || align=right | 1.7 km || 
|-id=140 bgcolor=#fefefe
| 237140 ||  || — || October 21, 2008 || Kitt Peak || Spacewatch || V || align=right data-sort-value="0.95" | 950 m || 
|-id=141 bgcolor=#d6d6d6
| 237141 ||  || — || October 21, 2008 || Kitt Peak || Spacewatch || — || align=right | 3.0 km || 
|-id=142 bgcolor=#E9E9E9
| 237142 ||  || — || October 21, 2008 || Kitt Peak || Spacewatch || — || align=right | 3.0 km || 
|-id=143 bgcolor=#E9E9E9
| 237143 ||  || — || October 21, 2008 || Kitt Peak || Spacewatch || — || align=right | 1.3 km || 
|-id=144 bgcolor=#E9E9E9
| 237144 ||  || — || October 21, 2008 || Kitt Peak || Spacewatch || — || align=right | 2.2 km || 
|-id=145 bgcolor=#d6d6d6
| 237145 ||  || — || October 21, 2008 || Mount Lemmon || Mount Lemmon Survey || EOS || align=right | 2.7 km || 
|-id=146 bgcolor=#E9E9E9
| 237146 ||  || — || October 21, 2008 || Mount Lemmon || Mount Lemmon Survey || — || align=right | 2.6 km || 
|-id=147 bgcolor=#fefefe
| 237147 ||  || — || October 21, 2008 || Kitt Peak || Spacewatch || — || align=right | 1.2 km || 
|-id=148 bgcolor=#E9E9E9
| 237148 ||  || — || October 21, 2008 || Kitt Peak || Spacewatch || — || align=right | 3.5 km || 
|-id=149 bgcolor=#d6d6d6
| 237149 ||  || — || October 21, 2008 || Mount Lemmon || Mount Lemmon Survey || — || align=right | 5.8 km || 
|-id=150 bgcolor=#d6d6d6
| 237150 ||  || — || October 23, 2008 || Mount Lemmon || Mount Lemmon Survey || — || align=right | 3.1 km || 
|-id=151 bgcolor=#E9E9E9
| 237151 ||  || — || October 25, 2008 || Dauban || F. Kugel || — || align=right | 1.5 km || 
|-id=152 bgcolor=#E9E9E9
| 237152 ||  || — || October 25, 2008 || Socorro || LINEAR || — || align=right | 1.4 km || 
|-id=153 bgcolor=#E9E9E9
| 237153 ||  || — || October 23, 2008 || Socorro || LINEAR || — || align=right | 3.3 km || 
|-id=154 bgcolor=#E9E9E9
| 237154 ||  || — || October 24, 2008 || Socorro || LINEAR || — || align=right | 2.7 km || 
|-id=155 bgcolor=#E9E9E9
| 237155 ||  || — || October 26, 2008 || Socorro || LINEAR || WIT || align=right | 1.7 km || 
|-id=156 bgcolor=#E9E9E9
| 237156 ||  || — || October 29, 2008 || Socorro || LINEAR || — || align=right | 2.0 km || 
|-id=157 bgcolor=#d6d6d6
| 237157 ||  || — || October 20, 2008 || Kitt Peak || Spacewatch || EUP || align=right | 7.3 km || 
|-id=158 bgcolor=#d6d6d6
| 237158 ||  || — || October 20, 2008 || Kitt Peak || Spacewatch || THM || align=right | 2.8 km || 
|-id=159 bgcolor=#fefefe
| 237159 ||  || — || October 22, 2008 || Kitt Peak || Spacewatch || — || align=right | 1.1 km || 
|-id=160 bgcolor=#E9E9E9
| 237160 ||  || — || October 22, 2008 || Kitt Peak || Spacewatch || — || align=right | 1.7 km || 
|-id=161 bgcolor=#d6d6d6
| 237161 ||  || — || October 22, 2008 || Kitt Peak || Spacewatch || EOS || align=right | 2.8 km || 
|-id=162 bgcolor=#E9E9E9
| 237162 ||  || — || October 22, 2008 || Kitt Peak || Spacewatch || — || align=right | 2.3 km || 
|-id=163 bgcolor=#E9E9E9
| 237163 ||  || — || October 22, 2008 || Kitt Peak || Spacewatch || PAD || align=right | 3.2 km || 
|-id=164 bgcolor=#fefefe
| 237164 Keelung ||  ||  || October 22, 2008 || Lulin Observatory || X. Y. Hsiao, Q.-z. Ye || — || align=right | 1.1 km || 
|-id=165 bgcolor=#d6d6d6
| 237165 ||  || — || October 23, 2008 || Kitt Peak || Spacewatch || — || align=right | 2.5 km || 
|-id=166 bgcolor=#E9E9E9
| 237166 ||  || — || October 23, 2008 || Kitt Peak || Spacewatch || — || align=right | 1.4 km || 
|-id=167 bgcolor=#E9E9E9
| 237167 ||  || — || October 23, 2008 || Kitt Peak || Spacewatch || — || align=right | 2.6 km || 
|-id=168 bgcolor=#d6d6d6
| 237168 ||  || — || October 23, 2008 || Kitt Peak || Spacewatch || THM || align=right | 2.9 km || 
|-id=169 bgcolor=#d6d6d6
| 237169 ||  || — || October 23, 2008 || Kitt Peak || Spacewatch || KOR || align=right | 1.5 km || 
|-id=170 bgcolor=#d6d6d6
| 237170 ||  || — || October 23, 2008 || Kitt Peak || Spacewatch || HYG || align=right | 3.6 km || 
|-id=171 bgcolor=#E9E9E9
| 237171 ||  || — || October 23, 2008 || Kitt Peak || Spacewatch || — || align=right | 2.6 km || 
|-id=172 bgcolor=#E9E9E9
| 237172 ||  || — || October 23, 2008 || Mount Lemmon || Mount Lemmon Survey || AGN || align=right | 1.1 km || 
|-id=173 bgcolor=#fefefe
| 237173 ||  || — || October 23, 2008 || Mount Lemmon || Mount Lemmon Survey || — || align=right | 1.9 km || 
|-id=174 bgcolor=#E9E9E9
| 237174 ||  || — || October 23, 2008 || Mount Lemmon || Mount Lemmon Survey || AGN || align=right | 1.4 km || 
|-id=175 bgcolor=#E9E9E9
| 237175 ||  || — || October 23, 2008 || Kitt Peak || Spacewatch || — || align=right | 1.8 km || 
|-id=176 bgcolor=#E9E9E9
| 237176 ||  || — || October 23, 2008 || Črni Vrh || Črni Vrh || HNS || align=right | 1.9 km || 
|-id=177 bgcolor=#d6d6d6
| 237177 ||  || — || October 24, 2008 || Bergisch Gladbach || W. Bickel || KOR || align=right | 1.6 km || 
|-id=178 bgcolor=#d6d6d6
| 237178 ||  || — || October 24, 2008 || Kitt Peak || Spacewatch || — || align=right | 4.3 km || 
|-id=179 bgcolor=#E9E9E9
| 237179 ||  || — || October 24, 2008 || Kitt Peak || Spacewatch || — || align=right | 1.5 km || 
|-id=180 bgcolor=#E9E9E9
| 237180 ||  || — || October 24, 2008 || Kitt Peak || Spacewatch || — || align=right | 2.1 km || 
|-id=181 bgcolor=#E9E9E9
| 237181 ||  || — || October 24, 2008 || Kitt Peak || Spacewatch || — || align=right | 1.1 km || 
|-id=182 bgcolor=#d6d6d6
| 237182 ||  || — || October 26, 2008 || Kitt Peak || Spacewatch || — || align=right | 3.0 km || 
|-id=183 bgcolor=#E9E9E9
| 237183 ||  || — || October 26, 2008 || Kitt Peak || Spacewatch || — || align=right | 1.9 km || 
|-id=184 bgcolor=#E9E9E9
| 237184 ||  || — || October 26, 2008 || Socorro || LINEAR || — || align=right | 2.0 km || 
|-id=185 bgcolor=#fefefe
| 237185 ||  || — || October 27, 2008 || Socorro || LINEAR || — || align=right | 1.2 km || 
|-id=186 bgcolor=#fefefe
| 237186 ||  || — || October 23, 2008 || Kitt Peak || Spacewatch || — || align=right | 1.3 km || 
|-id=187 bgcolor=#E9E9E9
| 237187 Zhonglihe ||  ||  || October 23, 2008 || Lulin Observatory || X. Y. Hsiao, Q.-z. Ye || — || align=right | 3.1 km || 
|-id=188 bgcolor=#E9E9E9
| 237188 ||  || — || October 25, 2008 || Kitt Peak || Spacewatch || — || align=right | 1.3 km || 
|-id=189 bgcolor=#E9E9E9
| 237189 ||  || — || October 25, 2008 || Kitt Peak || Spacewatch || — || align=right | 2.9 km || 
|-id=190 bgcolor=#d6d6d6
| 237190 ||  || — || October 25, 2008 || Catalina || CSS || K-2 || align=right | 2.1 km || 
|-id=191 bgcolor=#E9E9E9
| 237191 ||  || — || October 26, 2008 || Catalina || CSS || — || align=right | 3.3 km || 
|-id=192 bgcolor=#E9E9E9
| 237192 ||  || — || October 26, 2008 || Catalina || CSS || — || align=right | 1.3 km || 
|-id=193 bgcolor=#E9E9E9
| 237193 ||  || — || October 26, 2008 || Kitt Peak || Spacewatch || — || align=right | 1.3 km || 
|-id=194 bgcolor=#d6d6d6
| 237194 ||  || — || October 27, 2008 || Kitt Peak || Spacewatch || KOR || align=right | 1.6 km || 
|-id=195 bgcolor=#fefefe
| 237195 ||  || — || October 27, 2008 || Kitt Peak || Spacewatch || — || align=right data-sort-value="0.80" | 800 m || 
|-id=196 bgcolor=#d6d6d6
| 237196 ||  || — || October 27, 2008 || Kitt Peak || Spacewatch || — || align=right | 2.4 km || 
|-id=197 bgcolor=#E9E9E9
| 237197 ||  || — || October 27, 2008 || Kitt Peak || Spacewatch || — || align=right | 4.2 km || 
|-id=198 bgcolor=#d6d6d6
| 237198 ||  || — || October 27, 2008 || Kitt Peak || Spacewatch || KOR || align=right | 1.7 km || 
|-id=199 bgcolor=#E9E9E9
| 237199 ||  || — || October 27, 2008 || Kitt Peak || Spacewatch || — || align=right | 2.9 km || 
|-id=200 bgcolor=#E9E9E9
| 237200 ||  || — || October 28, 2008 || Kitt Peak || Spacewatch || — || align=right | 2.0 km || 
|}

237201–237300 

|-bgcolor=#fefefe
| 237201 ||  || — || October 28, 2008 || Kitt Peak || Spacewatch || MAS || align=right data-sort-value="0.84" | 840 m || 
|-id=202 bgcolor=#d6d6d6
| 237202 ||  || — || October 28, 2008 || Mount Lemmon || Mount Lemmon Survey || CHA || align=right | 2.7 km || 
|-id=203 bgcolor=#d6d6d6
| 237203 ||  || — || October 28, 2008 || Mount Lemmon || Mount Lemmon Survey || — || align=right | 3.3 km || 
|-id=204 bgcolor=#E9E9E9
| 237204 ||  || — || October 28, 2008 || Mount Lemmon || Mount Lemmon Survey || — || align=right | 1.6 km || 
|-id=205 bgcolor=#fefefe
| 237205 ||  || — || October 28, 2008 || Kitt Peak || Spacewatch || — || align=right data-sort-value="0.86" | 860 m || 
|-id=206 bgcolor=#d6d6d6
| 237206 ||  || — || October 28, 2008 || Kitt Peak || Spacewatch || EOS || align=right | 3.7 km || 
|-id=207 bgcolor=#E9E9E9
| 237207 ||  || — || October 28, 2008 || Kitt Peak || Spacewatch || — || align=right | 1.7 km || 
|-id=208 bgcolor=#E9E9E9
| 237208 ||  || — || October 28, 2008 || Kitt Peak || Spacewatch || — || align=right | 2.4 km || 
|-id=209 bgcolor=#fefefe
| 237209 ||  || — || October 29, 2008 || Kitt Peak || Spacewatch || — || align=right | 1.3 km || 
|-id=210 bgcolor=#E9E9E9
| 237210 ||  || — || October 30, 2008 || Catalina || CSS || — || align=right | 1.7 km || 
|-id=211 bgcolor=#E9E9E9
| 237211 ||  || — || October 30, 2008 || Kitt Peak || Spacewatch || — || align=right | 1.9 km || 
|-id=212 bgcolor=#E9E9E9
| 237212 ||  || — || October 31, 2008 || Kitt Peak || Spacewatch || — || align=right | 2.6 km || 
|-id=213 bgcolor=#fefefe
| 237213 ||  || — || October 31, 2008 || Kitt Peak || Spacewatch || — || align=right data-sort-value="0.98" | 980 m || 
|-id=214 bgcolor=#fefefe
| 237214 ||  || — || October 20, 2008 || Kitt Peak || Spacewatch || MAS || align=right data-sort-value="0.89" | 890 m || 
|-id=215 bgcolor=#E9E9E9
| 237215 ||  || — || October 21, 2008 || Kitt Peak || Spacewatch || — || align=right | 2.5 km || 
|-id=216 bgcolor=#E9E9E9
| 237216 ||  || — || October 23, 2008 || Mount Lemmon || Mount Lemmon Survey || — || align=right | 1.6 km || 
|-id=217 bgcolor=#d6d6d6
| 237217 ||  || — || October 23, 2008 || Mount Lemmon || Mount Lemmon Survey || THM || align=right | 2.4 km || 
|-id=218 bgcolor=#d6d6d6
| 237218 ||  || — || October 28, 2008 || Kitt Peak || Spacewatch || — || align=right | 3.9 km || 
|-id=219 bgcolor=#d6d6d6
| 237219 ||  || — || October 28, 2008 || Kitt Peak || Spacewatch || — || align=right | 3.0 km || 
|-id=220 bgcolor=#d6d6d6
| 237220 ||  || — || October 23, 2008 || Mount Lemmon || Mount Lemmon Survey || — || align=right | 3.0 km || 
|-id=221 bgcolor=#E9E9E9
| 237221 ||  || — || November 2, 2008 || Socorro || LINEAR || — || align=right | 4.2 km || 
|-id=222 bgcolor=#fefefe
| 237222 ||  || — || November 1, 2008 || Kitt Peak || Spacewatch || MAS || align=right | 1.0 km || 
|-id=223 bgcolor=#d6d6d6
| 237223 ||  || — || November 1, 2008 || Kitt Peak || Spacewatch || — || align=right | 2.8 km || 
|-id=224 bgcolor=#d6d6d6
| 237224 ||  || — || November 2, 2008 || Mount Lemmon || Mount Lemmon Survey || — || align=right | 3.2 km || 
|-id=225 bgcolor=#d6d6d6
| 237225 ||  || — || November 2, 2008 || Kitt Peak || Spacewatch || KOR || align=right | 1.4 km || 
|-id=226 bgcolor=#E9E9E9
| 237226 ||  || — || November 4, 2008 || Kitt Peak || Spacewatch || RAF || align=right | 1.8 km || 
|-id=227 bgcolor=#E9E9E9
| 237227 ||  || — || November 6, 2008 || Mount Lemmon || Mount Lemmon Survey || MRX || align=right | 1.5 km || 
|-id=228 bgcolor=#E9E9E9
| 237228 ||  || — || November 7, 2008 || Catalina || CSS || — || align=right | 2.0 km || 
|-id=229 bgcolor=#d6d6d6
| 237229 ||  || — || November 10, 2008 || La Sagra || OAM Obs. || HYG || align=right | 3.3 km || 
|-id=230 bgcolor=#E9E9E9
| 237230 ||  || — || November 6, 2008 || Mount Lemmon || Mount Lemmon Survey || JUN || align=right | 1.6 km || 
|-id=231 bgcolor=#d6d6d6
| 237231 ||  || — || November 2, 2008 || Catalina || CSS || — || align=right | 4.3 km || 
|-id=232 bgcolor=#d6d6d6
| 237232 ||  || — || November 8, 2008 || Mount Lemmon || Mount Lemmon Survey || — || align=right | 3.4 km || 
|-id=233 bgcolor=#E9E9E9
| 237233 ||  || — || November 7, 2008 || Mount Lemmon || Mount Lemmon Survey || WIT || align=right | 1.5 km || 
|-id=234 bgcolor=#d6d6d6
| 237234 ||  || — || November 2, 2008 || Catalina || CSS || — || align=right | 3.9 km || 
|-id=235 bgcolor=#d6d6d6
| 237235 ||  || — || November 1, 2008 || Mount Lemmon || Mount Lemmon Survey || — || align=right | 2.9 km || 
|-id=236 bgcolor=#d6d6d6
| 237236 ||  || — || November 17, 2008 || Kitt Peak || Spacewatch || KOR || align=right | 1.9 km || 
|-id=237 bgcolor=#d6d6d6
| 237237 ||  || — || November 18, 2008 || Catalina || CSS || KOR || align=right | 2.0 km || 
|-id=238 bgcolor=#d6d6d6
| 237238 ||  || — || November 18, 2008 || La Sagra || OAM Obs. || — || align=right | 3.3 km || 
|-id=239 bgcolor=#E9E9E9
| 237239 ||  || — || November 20, 2008 || Bisei SG Center || BATTeRS || — || align=right | 1.4 km || 
|-id=240 bgcolor=#E9E9E9
| 237240 ||  || — || November 17, 2008 || Kitt Peak || Spacewatch || HEN || align=right | 1.5 km || 
|-id=241 bgcolor=#E9E9E9
| 237241 ||  || — || November 17, 2008 || Kitt Peak || Spacewatch || AGN || align=right | 1.4 km || 
|-id=242 bgcolor=#E9E9E9
| 237242 ||  || — || November 17, 2008 || Kitt Peak || Spacewatch || AGN || align=right | 1.1 km || 
|-id=243 bgcolor=#d6d6d6
| 237243 ||  || — || November 17, 2008 || Kitt Peak || Spacewatch || KOR || align=right | 1.6 km || 
|-id=244 bgcolor=#E9E9E9
| 237244 ||  || — || November 17, 2008 || Kitt Peak || Spacewatch || — || align=right | 2.0 km || 
|-id=245 bgcolor=#d6d6d6
| 237245 ||  || — || November 17, 2008 || Kitt Peak || Spacewatch || — || align=right | 2.8 km || 
|-id=246 bgcolor=#E9E9E9
| 237246 ||  || — || November 19, 2008 || Catalina || CSS || — || align=right | 2.3 km || 
|-id=247 bgcolor=#fefefe
| 237247 ||  || — || November 21, 2008 || Mount Lemmon || Mount Lemmon Survey || — || align=right | 1.4 km || 
|-id=248 bgcolor=#d6d6d6
| 237248 ||  || — || November 18, 2008 || Kitt Peak || Spacewatch || THM || align=right | 2.3 km || 
|-id=249 bgcolor=#d6d6d6
| 237249 ||  || — || November 18, 2008 || Kitt Peak || Spacewatch || KOR || align=right | 1.9 km || 
|-id=250 bgcolor=#fefefe
| 237250 ||  || — || November 18, 2008 || Catalina || CSS || — || align=right | 1.1 km || 
|-id=251 bgcolor=#d6d6d6
| 237251 ||  || — || November 18, 2008 || Kitt Peak || Spacewatch || — || align=right | 3.9 km || 
|-id=252 bgcolor=#d6d6d6
| 237252 ||  || — || November 18, 2008 || Kitt Peak || Spacewatch || THM || align=right | 3.8 km || 
|-id=253 bgcolor=#d6d6d6
| 237253 ||  || — || November 19, 2008 || Kitt Peak || Spacewatch || 3:2 || align=right | 4.8 km || 
|-id=254 bgcolor=#E9E9E9
| 237254 ||  || — || November 20, 2008 || Kitt Peak || Spacewatch || HEN || align=right | 1.2 km || 
|-id=255 bgcolor=#d6d6d6
| 237255 ||  || — || November 20, 2008 || Kitt Peak || Spacewatch || SHU3:2 || align=right | 6.3 km || 
|-id=256 bgcolor=#E9E9E9
| 237256 ||  || — || November 20, 2008 || Kitt Peak || Spacewatch || HOF || align=right | 2.6 km || 
|-id=257 bgcolor=#E9E9E9
| 237257 ||  || — || November 20, 2008 || Kitt Peak || Spacewatch || — || align=right | 2.8 km || 
|-id=258 bgcolor=#E9E9E9
| 237258 ||  || — || November 20, 2008 || Kitt Peak || Spacewatch || — || align=right | 2.5 km || 
|-id=259 bgcolor=#E9E9E9
| 237259 ||  || — || November 20, 2008 || Kitt Peak || Spacewatch || AGN || align=right | 1.7 km || 
|-id=260 bgcolor=#d6d6d6
| 237260 ||  || — || November 24, 2008 || Dauban || F. Kugel || — || align=right | 3.0 km || 
|-id=261 bgcolor=#E9E9E9
| 237261 ||  || — || November 28, 2008 || Pla D'Arguines || R. Ferrando || — || align=right | 2.4 km || 
|-id=262 bgcolor=#E9E9E9
| 237262 ||  || — || November 23, 2008 || Socorro || LINEAR || — || align=right | 2.1 km || 
|-id=263 bgcolor=#E9E9E9
| 237263 ||  || — || November 23, 2008 || Socorro || LINEAR || AGN || align=right | 1.9 km || 
|-id=264 bgcolor=#E9E9E9
| 237264 ||  || — || November 28, 2008 || Piszkéstető || K. Sárneczky, Á. Kárpáti || — || align=right | 3.2 km || 
|-id=265 bgcolor=#E9E9E9
| 237265 Golobokov ||  ||  || November 28, 2008 || Zelenchukskaya || T. V. Kryachko || MAR || align=right | 1.6 km || 
|-id=266 bgcolor=#E9E9E9
| 237266 ||  || — || November 30, 2008 || Mayhill || A. Lowe || — || align=right | 2.9 km || 
|-id=267 bgcolor=#E9E9E9
| 237267 ||  || — || November 30, 2008 || Socorro || LINEAR || — || align=right | 1.4 km || 
|-id=268 bgcolor=#E9E9E9
| 237268 ||  || — || November 19, 2008 || Catalina || CSS || — || align=right | 1.9 km || 
|-id=269 bgcolor=#E9E9E9
| 237269 ||  || — || November 30, 2008 || Mount Lemmon || Mount Lemmon Survey || — || align=right | 1.2 km || 
|-id=270 bgcolor=#d6d6d6
| 237270 ||  || — || November 30, 2008 || Kitt Peak || Spacewatch || — || align=right | 2.8 km || 
|-id=271 bgcolor=#E9E9E9
| 237271 ||  || — || November 30, 2008 || Kitt Peak || Spacewatch || — || align=right | 2.0 km || 
|-id=272 bgcolor=#E9E9E9
| 237272 ||  || — || November 19, 2008 || Kitt Peak || Spacewatch || DOR || align=right | 3.8 km || 
|-id=273 bgcolor=#E9E9E9
| 237273 ||  || — || November 18, 2008 || Kitt Peak || Spacewatch || AGN || align=right | 1.4 km || 
|-id=274 bgcolor=#d6d6d6
| 237274 ||  || — || November 30, 2008 || Catalina || CSS || — || align=right | 5.6 km || 
|-id=275 bgcolor=#fefefe
| 237275 ||  || — || November 18, 2008 || Socorro || LINEAR || — || align=right | 1.7 km || 
|-id=276 bgcolor=#E9E9E9
| 237276 Nakama ||  ||  || December 2, 2008 || Geisei || T. Seki || — || align=right | 4.1 km || 
|-id=277 bgcolor=#d6d6d6
| 237277 Nevaruth ||  ||  || December 5, 2008 || Wiggins Observatory || P. Wiggins || — || align=right | 3.0 km || 
|-id=278 bgcolor=#d6d6d6
| 237278 ||  || — || December 3, 2008 || Socorro || LINEAR || HIL3:2 || align=right | 7.4 km || 
|-id=279 bgcolor=#E9E9E9
| 237279 ||  || — || December 7, 2008 || San Marcello || Pistoia Mountains Obs. || — || align=right | 3.0 km || 
|-id=280 bgcolor=#d6d6d6
| 237280 ||  || — || December 1, 2008 || Kitt Peak || Spacewatch || — || align=right | 4.7 km || 
|-id=281 bgcolor=#E9E9E9
| 237281 ||  || — || December 2, 2008 || Mount Lemmon || Mount Lemmon Survey || — || align=right | 1.8 km || 
|-id=282 bgcolor=#d6d6d6
| 237282 ||  || — || December 3, 2008 || Mount Lemmon || Mount Lemmon Survey || 7:4 || align=right | 4.1 km || 
|-id=283 bgcolor=#d6d6d6
| 237283 ||  || — || December 1, 2008 || Kitt Peak || Spacewatch || — || align=right | 2.6 km || 
|-id=284 bgcolor=#d6d6d6
| 237284 ||  || — || December 1, 2008 || Kitt Peak || Spacewatch || — || align=right | 3.2 km || 
|-id=285 bgcolor=#d6d6d6
| 237285 ||  || — || December 1, 2008 || Kitt Peak || Spacewatch || KOR || align=right | 1.8 km || 
|-id=286 bgcolor=#d6d6d6
| 237286 ||  || — || December 1, 2008 || Kitt Peak || Spacewatch || — || align=right | 4.7 km || 
|-id=287 bgcolor=#E9E9E9
| 237287 ||  || — || December 2, 2008 || Kitt Peak || Spacewatch || — || align=right | 1.9 km || 
|-id=288 bgcolor=#E9E9E9
| 237288 ||  || — || December 2, 2008 || Kitt Peak || Spacewatch || — || align=right | 1.8 km || 
|-id=289 bgcolor=#E9E9E9
| 237289 ||  || — || December 2, 2008 || Kitt Peak || Spacewatch || HEN || align=right | 1.3 km || 
|-id=290 bgcolor=#E9E9E9
| 237290 ||  || — || December 2, 2008 || Kitt Peak || Spacewatch || HEN || align=right | 1.4 km || 
|-id=291 bgcolor=#E9E9E9
| 237291 ||  || — || December 4, 2008 || Mount Lemmon || Mount Lemmon Survey || — || align=right | 1.2 km || 
|-id=292 bgcolor=#d6d6d6
| 237292 ||  || — || December 4, 2008 || Mount Lemmon || Mount Lemmon Survey || — || align=right | 5.3 km || 
|-id=293 bgcolor=#E9E9E9
| 237293 ||  || — || December 4, 2008 || Mount Lemmon || Mount Lemmon Survey || — || align=right | 1.9 km || 
|-id=294 bgcolor=#d6d6d6
| 237294 ||  || — || December 19, 2008 || La Sagra || OAM Obs. || HYG || align=right | 4.1 km || 
|-id=295 bgcolor=#fefefe
| 237295 ||  || — || December 20, 2008 || La Sagra || OAM Obs. || CLA || align=right | 3.1 km || 
|-id=296 bgcolor=#d6d6d6
| 237296 ||  || — || December 21, 2008 || Mount Lemmon || Mount Lemmon Survey || HYG || align=right | 4.0 km || 
|-id=297 bgcolor=#d6d6d6
| 237297 ||  || — || December 28, 2008 || Taunus || S. Karge, R. Kling || THM || align=right | 3.6 km || 
|-id=298 bgcolor=#d6d6d6
| 237298 ||  || — || December 27, 2008 || Bisei SG Center || BATTeRS || — || align=right | 4.4 km || 
|-id=299 bgcolor=#d6d6d6
| 237299 ||  || — || December 31, 2008 || Altschwendt || W. Ries || EOS || align=right | 3.2 km || 
|-id=300 bgcolor=#d6d6d6
| 237300 ||  || — || December 27, 2008 || Bergisch Gladbac || W. Bickel || — || align=right | 4.4 km || 
|}

237301–237400 

|-bgcolor=#d6d6d6
| 237301 ||  || — || December 29, 2008 || Kitt Peak || Spacewatch || THM || align=right | 3.2 km || 
|-id=302 bgcolor=#d6d6d6
| 237302 ||  || — || December 30, 2008 || Kitt Peak || Spacewatch || — || align=right | 3.8 km || 
|-id=303 bgcolor=#d6d6d6
| 237303 ||  || — || December 30, 2008 || Kitt Peak || Spacewatch || — || align=right | 4.0 km || 
|-id=304 bgcolor=#d6d6d6
| 237304 ||  || — || December 30, 2008 || Mount Lemmon || Mount Lemmon Survey || HYG || align=right | 3.2 km || 
|-id=305 bgcolor=#d6d6d6
| 237305 ||  || — || December 29, 2008 || Kitt Peak || Spacewatch || KOR || align=right | 1.6 km || 
|-id=306 bgcolor=#d6d6d6
| 237306 ||  || — || December 29, 2008 || Kitt Peak || Spacewatch || — || align=right | 4.0 km || 
|-id=307 bgcolor=#d6d6d6
| 237307 ||  || — || December 29, 2008 || Kitt Peak || Spacewatch || — || align=right | 2.8 km || 
|-id=308 bgcolor=#d6d6d6
| 237308 ||  || — || December 29, 2008 || Kitt Peak || Spacewatch || — || align=right | 2.7 km || 
|-id=309 bgcolor=#d6d6d6
| 237309 ||  || — || December 29, 2008 || Kitt Peak || Spacewatch || — || align=right | 2.6 km || 
|-id=310 bgcolor=#d6d6d6
| 237310 ||  || — || December 30, 2008 || Mount Lemmon || Mount Lemmon Survey || HIL3:2 || align=right | 9.0 km || 
|-id=311 bgcolor=#d6d6d6
| 237311 ||  || — || December 30, 2008 || Kitt Peak || Spacewatch || — || align=right | 2.9 km || 
|-id=312 bgcolor=#d6d6d6
| 237312 ||  || — || December 30, 2008 || Kitt Peak || Spacewatch || — || align=right | 3.3 km || 
|-id=313 bgcolor=#E9E9E9
| 237313 ||  || — || December 29, 2008 || Mount Lemmon || Mount Lemmon Survey || HEN || align=right | 1.4 km || 
|-id=314 bgcolor=#d6d6d6
| 237314 ||  || — || December 22, 2008 || Kitt Peak || Spacewatch || — || align=right | 5.1 km || 
|-id=315 bgcolor=#d6d6d6
| 237315 ||  || — || January 2, 2009 || Mount Lemmon || Mount Lemmon Survey || — || align=right | 2.9 km || 
|-id=316 bgcolor=#d6d6d6
| 237316 ||  || — || January 15, 2009 || Kitt Peak || Spacewatch || — || align=right | 5.4 km || 
|-id=317 bgcolor=#fefefe
| 237317 ||  || — || January 15, 2009 || Kitt Peak || Spacewatch || MAS || align=right | 1.2 km || 
|-id=318 bgcolor=#d6d6d6
| 237318 ||  || — || January 3, 2009 || Mount Lemmon || Mount Lemmon Survey || — || align=right | 3.4 km || 
|-id=319 bgcolor=#fefefe
| 237319 ||  || — || January 16, 2009 || Mount Lemmon || Mount Lemmon Survey || V || align=right data-sort-value="0.98" | 980 m || 
|-id=320 bgcolor=#d6d6d6
| 237320 ||  || — || January 16, 2009 || Mount Lemmon || Mount Lemmon Survey || — || align=right | 4.2 km || 
|-id=321 bgcolor=#d6d6d6
| 237321 ||  || — || January 16, 2009 || Mount Lemmon || Mount Lemmon Survey || 3:2 || align=right | 8.1 km || 
|-id=322 bgcolor=#E9E9E9
| 237322 ||  || — || January 25, 2009 || Kitt Peak || Spacewatch || — || align=right | 3.1 km || 
|-id=323 bgcolor=#d6d6d6
| 237323 ||  || — || January 25, 2009 || Kitt Peak || Spacewatch || 3:2 || align=right | 5.9 km || 
|-id=324 bgcolor=#d6d6d6
| 237324 ||  || — || January 25, 2009 || Catalina || CSS || — || align=right | 5.1 km || 
|-id=325 bgcolor=#d6d6d6
| 237325 ||  || — || January 29, 2009 || Kitt Peak || Spacewatch || — || align=right | 3.6 km || 
|-id=326 bgcolor=#d6d6d6
| 237326 ||  || — || January 31, 2009 || Mount Lemmon || Mount Lemmon Survey || HYG || align=right | 3.4 km || 
|-id=327 bgcolor=#E9E9E9
| 237327 ||  || — || January 18, 2009 || Kitt Peak || Spacewatch || — || align=right | 3.2 km || 
|-id=328 bgcolor=#E9E9E9
| 237328 ||  || — || February 1, 2009 || Socorro || LINEAR || — || align=right | 3.7 km || 
|-id=329 bgcolor=#d6d6d6
| 237329 ||  || — || February 4, 2009 || Wildberg || R. Apitzsch || — || align=right | 6.0 km || 
|-id=330 bgcolor=#d6d6d6
| 237330 ||  || — || February 14, 2009 || Mount Lemmon || Mount Lemmon Survey || THM || align=right | 3.7 km || 
|-id=331 bgcolor=#d6d6d6
| 237331 ||  || — || March 19, 2009 || La Sagra || OAM Obs. || EUP || align=right | 4.9 km || 
|-id=332 bgcolor=#C2FFFF
| 237332 ||  || — || October 24, 2009 || Catalina || CSS || L4 || align=right | 13 km || 
|-id=333 bgcolor=#E9E9E9
| 237333 ||  || — || October 24, 2009 || Catalina || CSS || KON || align=right | 4.8 km || 
|-id=334 bgcolor=#E9E9E9
| 237334 ||  || — || October 26, 2009 || Kitt Peak || Spacewatch || — || align=right | 4.4 km || 
|-id=335 bgcolor=#E9E9E9
| 237335 ||  || — || November 8, 2009 || Catalina || CSS || — || align=right | 2.8 km || 
|-id=336 bgcolor=#d6d6d6
| 237336 ||  || — || November 21, 2009 || Mayhill || iTelescope Obs. || — || align=right | 4.6 km || 
|-id=337 bgcolor=#E9E9E9
| 237337 ||  || — || November 16, 2009 || Kitt Peak || Spacewatch || — || align=right | 2.8 km || 
|-id=338 bgcolor=#C2FFFF
| 237338 ||  || — || November 16, 2009 || Mount Lemmon || Mount Lemmon Survey || L4 || align=right | 14 km || 
|-id=339 bgcolor=#E9E9E9
| 237339 ||  || — || November 21, 2009 || Kitt Peak || Spacewatch || HOF || align=right | 4.4 km || 
|-id=340 bgcolor=#E9E9E9
| 237340 ||  || — || November 27, 2009 || Mount Lemmon || Mount Lemmon Survey || AST || align=right | 2.6 km || 
|-id=341 bgcolor=#d6d6d6
| 237341 ||  || — || November 25, 2009 || Kitt Peak || Spacewatch || EOS || align=right | 5.9 km || 
|-id=342 bgcolor=#E9E9E9
| 237342 ||  || — || December 10, 2009 || Socorro || LINEAR || — || align=right | 2.0 km || 
|-id=343 bgcolor=#E9E9E9
| 237343 ||  || — || December 18, 2009 || Kitt Peak || Spacewatch || HNS || align=right | 1.7 km || 
|-id=344 bgcolor=#fefefe
| 237344 ||  || — || January 6, 2010 || Kitt Peak || Spacewatch || FLO || align=right | 1.4 km || 
|-id=345 bgcolor=#E9E9E9
| 237345 ||  || — || January 7, 2010 || Kitt Peak || Spacewatch || WIT || align=right | 1.4 km || 
|-id=346 bgcolor=#fefefe
| 237346 ||  || — || January 8, 2010 || Kitt Peak || Spacewatch || — || align=right | 1.1 km || 
|-id=347 bgcolor=#E9E9E9
| 237347 ||  || — || January 15, 2010 || Socorro || LINEAR || — || align=right | 2.6 km || 
|-id=348 bgcolor=#fefefe
| 237348 ||  || — || January 15, 2010 || Kitt Peak || Spacewatch || — || align=right | 1.4 km || 
|-id=349 bgcolor=#d6d6d6
| 237349 ||  || — || February 12, 2010 || Mayhill || iTelescope Obs. || — || align=right | 2.4 km || 
|-id=350 bgcolor=#fefefe
| 237350 ||  || — || February 13, 2010 || Kitt Peak || Spacewatch || — || align=right | 1.1 km || 
|-id=351 bgcolor=#fefefe
| 237351 || 2235 P-L || — || September 24, 1960 || Palomar || PLS || — || align=right | 1.3 km || 
|-id=352 bgcolor=#E9E9E9
| 237352 || 4307 P-L || — || September 24, 1960 || Palomar || PLS || EUN || align=right | 1.3 km || 
|-id=353 bgcolor=#FA8072
| 237353 || 1207 T-2 || — || September 29, 1973 || Palomar || PLS || — || align=right | 1.3 km || 
|-id=354 bgcolor=#fefefe
| 237354 || 1711 T-2 || — || September 29, 1973 || Palomar || PLS || — || align=right | 1.4 km || 
|-id=355 bgcolor=#fefefe
| 237355 || 2296 T-2 || — || September 29, 1973 || Palomar || PLS || NYS || align=right | 1.1 km || 
|-id=356 bgcolor=#d6d6d6
| 237356 || 3103 T-2 || — || September 30, 1973 || Palomar || PLS || — || align=right | 4.4 km || 
|-id=357 bgcolor=#fefefe
| 237357 || 2059 T-3 || — || October 16, 1977 || Palomar || PLS || — || align=right | 1.7 km || 
|-id=358 bgcolor=#fefefe
| 237358 || 3206 T-3 || — || October 16, 1977 || Palomar || PLS || FLO || align=right data-sort-value="0.76" | 760 m || 
|-id=359 bgcolor=#d6d6d6
| 237359 || 3774 T-3 || — || October 16, 1977 || Palomar || PLS || — || align=right | 2.9 km || 
|-id=360 bgcolor=#E9E9E9
| 237360 || 4539 T-3 || — || October 16, 1977 || Palomar || PLS || — || align=right | 2.8 km || 
|-id=361 bgcolor=#d6d6d6
| 237361 ||  || — || March 6, 1981 || Siding Spring || S. J. Bus || — || align=right | 3.5 km || 
|-id=362 bgcolor=#E9E9E9
| 237362 ||  || — || March 19, 1993 || La Silla || UESAC || — || align=right | 1.8 km || 
|-id=363 bgcolor=#d6d6d6
| 237363 ||  || — || April 22, 1993 || Kitt Peak || Spacewatch || VER || align=right | 4.6 km || 
|-id=364 bgcolor=#E9E9E9
| 237364 ||  || — || October 9, 1993 || La Silla || E. W. Elst || — || align=right | 3.4 km || 
|-id=365 bgcolor=#d6d6d6
| 237365 ||  || — || March 6, 1994 || Kitt Peak || Spacewatch || — || align=right | 4.2 km || 
|-id=366 bgcolor=#fefefe
| 237366 ||  || — || August 10, 1994 || La Silla || E. W. Elst || FLO || align=right | 1.4 km || 
|-id=367 bgcolor=#E9E9E9
| 237367 ||  || — || August 10, 1994 || La Silla || E. W. Elst || DOR || align=right | 4.3 km || 
|-id=368 bgcolor=#E9E9E9
| 237368 ||  || — || October 28, 1994 || Kitt Peak || Spacewatch || — || align=right | 2.0 km || 
|-id=369 bgcolor=#E9E9E9
| 237369 ||  || — || November 28, 1994 || Kitt Peak || Spacewatch || — || align=right | 2.2 km || 
|-id=370 bgcolor=#E9E9E9
| 237370 ||  || — || November 28, 1994 || Kitt Peak || Spacewatch || — || align=right | 2.0 km || 
|-id=371 bgcolor=#fefefe
| 237371 ||  || — || February 24, 1995 || Kitt Peak || Spacewatch || MAS || align=right | 1.0 km || 
|-id=372 bgcolor=#E9E9E9
| 237372 ||  || — || July 27, 1995 || Kitt Peak || Spacewatch || — || align=right | 1.5 km || 
|-id=373 bgcolor=#E9E9E9
| 237373 ||  || — || August 25, 1995 || Kitt Peak || Spacewatch || — || align=right | 1.9 km || 
|-id=374 bgcolor=#E9E9E9
| 237374 ||  || — || September 17, 1995 || Kitt Peak || Spacewatch || — || align=right | 3.1 km || 
|-id=375 bgcolor=#E9E9E9
| 237375 ||  || — || September 18, 1995 || Kitt Peak || Spacewatch || RAF || align=right | 1.4 km || 
|-id=376 bgcolor=#E9E9E9
| 237376 ||  || — || September 26, 1995 || Kitt Peak || Spacewatch || — || align=right | 1.5 km || 
|-id=377 bgcolor=#d6d6d6
| 237377 ||  || — || September 26, 1995 || Kitt Peak || Spacewatch || THM || align=right | 3.5 km || 
|-id=378 bgcolor=#d6d6d6
| 237378 ||  || — || September 22, 1995 || Kitt Peak || Spacewatch || — || align=right | 4.3 km || 
|-id=379 bgcolor=#d6d6d6
| 237379 ||  || — || October 18, 1995 || Kitt Peak || Spacewatch || HYG || align=right | 4.2 km || 
|-id=380 bgcolor=#d6d6d6
| 237380 ||  || — || November 14, 1995 || Kitt Peak || Spacewatch || — || align=right | 3.9 km || 
|-id=381 bgcolor=#d6d6d6
| 237381 ||  || — || November 14, 1995 || Kitt Peak || Spacewatch || — || align=right | 4.9 km || 
|-id=382 bgcolor=#fefefe
| 237382 ||  || — || November 14, 1995 || Xinglong || SCAP || — || align=right | 1.2 km || 
|-id=383 bgcolor=#E9E9E9
| 237383 ||  || — || January 13, 1996 || Kitt Peak || Spacewatch || HEN || align=right data-sort-value="0.98" | 980 m || 
|-id=384 bgcolor=#fefefe
| 237384 || 1996 CX || — || February 7, 1996 || Xinglong || SCAP || H || align=right data-sort-value="0.80" | 800 m || 
|-id=385 bgcolor=#E9E9E9
| 237385 ||  || — || March 13, 1996 || Kitt Peak || Spacewatch || — || align=right | 3.5 km || 
|-id=386 bgcolor=#E9E9E9
| 237386 ||  || — || April 17, 1996 || Kitt Peak || Spacewatch || HOF || align=right | 3.5 km || 
|-id=387 bgcolor=#d6d6d6
| 237387 ||  || — || August 1, 1996 || Haleakala || AMOS || — || align=right | 6.8 km || 
|-id=388 bgcolor=#d6d6d6
| 237388 || 1996 TL || — || October 3, 1996 || Prescott || P. G. Comba || — || align=right | 4.6 km || 
|-id=389 bgcolor=#d6d6d6
| 237389 ||  || — || November 8, 1996 || Kitt Peak || Spacewatch || — || align=right | 3.4 km || 
|-id=390 bgcolor=#d6d6d6
| 237390 ||  || — || December 5, 1996 || Kitt Peak || Spacewatch || — || align=right | 3.3 km || 
|-id=391 bgcolor=#FA8072
| 237391 ||  || — || January 9, 1997 || Kitt Peak || Spacewatch || H || align=right data-sort-value="0.97" | 970 m || 
|-id=392 bgcolor=#fefefe
| 237392 ||  || — || May 1, 1997 || Socorro || LINEAR || FLO || align=right data-sort-value="0.80" | 800 m || 
|-id=393 bgcolor=#fefefe
| 237393 || 1997 LG || — || June 1, 1997 || Kitt Peak || Spacewatch || — || align=right | 1.1 km || 
|-id=394 bgcolor=#d6d6d6
| 237394 ||  || — || September 28, 1997 || Kitt Peak || Spacewatch || — || align=right | 2.8 km || 
|-id=395 bgcolor=#fefefe
| 237395 ||  || — || September 27, 1997 || Kitt Peak || Spacewatch || — || align=right data-sort-value="0.94" | 940 m || 
|-id=396 bgcolor=#d6d6d6
| 237396 ||  || — || September 29, 1997 || Kitt Peak || Spacewatch || THM || align=right | 2.6 km || 
|-id=397 bgcolor=#fefefe
| 237397 ||  || — || January 6, 1998 || Anderson Mesa || M. W. Buie || — || align=right | 1.2 km || 
|-id=398 bgcolor=#d6d6d6
| 237398 ||  || — || January 22, 1998 || Kitt Peak || Spacewatch || EUP || align=right | 5.4 km || 
|-id=399 bgcolor=#E9E9E9
| 237399 ||  || — || April 23, 1998 || Socorro || LINEAR || MIT || align=right | 3.8 km || 
|-id=400 bgcolor=#E9E9E9
| 237400 ||  || — || June 16, 1998 || Kitt Peak || Spacewatch || — || align=right | 3.5 km || 
|}

237401–237500 

|-bgcolor=#fefefe
| 237401 ||  || — || August 17, 1998 || Socorro || LINEAR || — || align=right | 1.2 km || 
|-id=402 bgcolor=#E9E9E9
| 237402 ||  || — || August 23, 1998 || Xinglong || SCAP || — || align=right | 2.0 km || 
|-id=403 bgcolor=#E9E9E9
| 237403 ||  || — || August 24, 1998 || Socorro || LINEAR || — || align=right | 4.7 km || 
|-id=404 bgcolor=#E9E9E9
| 237404 ||  || — || September 14, 1998 || Socorro || LINEAR || — || align=right | 3.3 km || 
|-id=405 bgcolor=#E9E9E9
| 237405 ||  || — || September 14, 1998 || Socorro || LINEAR || EUN || align=right | 2.7 km || 
|-id=406 bgcolor=#fefefe
| 237406 ||  || — || September 19, 1998 || Kitt Peak || Spacewatch || — || align=right | 2.4 km || 
|-id=407 bgcolor=#E9E9E9
| 237407 ||  || — || September 26, 1998 || Socorro || LINEAR || MIT || align=right | 3.2 km || 
|-id=408 bgcolor=#E9E9E9
| 237408 ||  || — || September 21, 1998 || La Silla || E. W. Elst || — || align=right | 2.0 km || 
|-id=409 bgcolor=#E9E9E9
| 237409 ||  || — || September 26, 1998 || Socorro || LINEAR || — || align=right | 3.5 km || 
|-id=410 bgcolor=#E9E9E9
| 237410 ||  || — || September 26, 1998 || Socorro || LINEAR || — || align=right | 3.6 km || 
|-id=411 bgcolor=#E9E9E9
| 237411 ||  || — || September 26, 1998 || Socorro || LINEAR || — || align=right | 3.3 km || 
|-id=412 bgcolor=#fefefe
| 237412 ||  || — || September 26, 1998 || Socorro || LINEAR || NYS || align=right | 2.2 km || 
|-id=413 bgcolor=#E9E9E9
| 237413 ||  || — || October 15, 1998 || Kitt Peak || Spacewatch || — || align=right | 3.7 km || 
|-id=414 bgcolor=#d6d6d6
| 237414 ||  || — || October 20, 1998 || Caussols || ODAS || NAE || align=right | 6.0 km || 
|-id=415 bgcolor=#d6d6d6
| 237415 ||  || — || October 22, 1998 || Višnjan Observatory || K. Korlević || — || align=right | 4.1 km || 
|-id=416 bgcolor=#E9E9E9
| 237416 ||  || — || October 28, 1998 || Socorro || LINEAR || — || align=right | 1.6 km || 
|-id=417 bgcolor=#E9E9E9
| 237417 ||  || — || October 17, 1998 || Anderson Mesa || LONEOS || — || align=right | 3.4 km || 
|-id=418 bgcolor=#E9E9E9
| 237418 ||  || — || October 27, 1998 || Kitt Peak || Spacewatch || — || align=right | 3.6 km || 
|-id=419 bgcolor=#E9E9E9
| 237419 ||  || — || November 18, 1998 || Kitt Peak || Spacewatch || AGN || align=right | 1.6 km || 
|-id=420 bgcolor=#E9E9E9
| 237420 ||  || — || December 8, 1998 || Kitt Peak || Spacewatch || RAF || align=right | 2.6 km || 
|-id=421 bgcolor=#fefefe
| 237421 ||  || — || December 15, 1998 || Kitt Peak || Spacewatch || FLO || align=right data-sort-value="0.92" | 920 m || 
|-id=422 bgcolor=#fefefe
| 237422 ||  || — || January 9, 1999 || Mérida || O. A. Naranjo || — || align=right data-sort-value="0.98" | 980 m || 
|-id=423 bgcolor=#d6d6d6
| 237423 ||  || — || January 16, 1999 || Kitt Peak || Spacewatch || — || align=right | 5.2 km || 
|-id=424 bgcolor=#d6d6d6
| 237424 ||  || — || February 10, 1999 || Socorro || LINEAR || — || align=right | 4.3 km || 
|-id=425 bgcolor=#fefefe
| 237425 ||  || — || March 16, 1999 || Kitt Peak || Spacewatch || MAS || align=right data-sort-value="0.97" | 970 m || 
|-id=426 bgcolor=#d6d6d6
| 237426 ||  || — || March 20, 1999 || Apache Point || SDSS || — || align=right | 2.9 km || 
|-id=427 bgcolor=#d6d6d6
| 237427 ||  || — || March 21, 1999 || Apache Point || SDSS || — || align=right | 4.1 km || 
|-id=428 bgcolor=#d6d6d6
| 237428 ||  || — || March 21, 1999 || Apache Point || SDSS || TIR || align=right | 2.4 km || 
|-id=429 bgcolor=#fefefe
| 237429 ||  || — || April 7, 1999 || Socorro || LINEAR || — || align=right | 1.7 km || 
|-id=430 bgcolor=#fefefe
| 237430 ||  || — || May 10, 1999 || Socorro || LINEAR || — || align=right | 3.2 km || 
|-id=431 bgcolor=#d6d6d6
| 237431 ||  || — || May 14, 1999 || Socorro || LINEAR || — || align=right | 4.0 km || 
|-id=432 bgcolor=#fefefe
| 237432 ||  || — || May 12, 1999 || Socorro || LINEAR || — || align=right | 1.5 km || 
|-id=433 bgcolor=#d6d6d6
| 237433 ||  || — || July 15, 1999 || Socorro || LINEAR || Tj (2.98) || align=right | 5.1 km || 
|-id=434 bgcolor=#E9E9E9
| 237434 ||  || — || August 10, 1999 || Ondřejov || P. Pravec, P. Kušnirák || — || align=right | 5.6 km || 
|-id=435 bgcolor=#d6d6d6
| 237435 ||  || — || September 4, 1999 || Kitt Peak || Spacewatch || 7:4 || align=right | 4.0 km || 
|-id=436 bgcolor=#E9E9E9
| 237436 ||  || — || September 7, 1999 || Socorro || LINEAR || — || align=right | 1.6 km || 
|-id=437 bgcolor=#fefefe
| 237437 ||  || — || September 7, 1999 || Socorro || LINEAR || — || align=right | 2.2 km || 
|-id=438 bgcolor=#fefefe
| 237438 ||  || — || September 7, 1999 || Socorro || LINEAR || NYS || align=right | 1.00 km || 
|-id=439 bgcolor=#E9E9E9
| 237439 ||  || — || September 9, 1999 || Socorro || LINEAR || — || align=right | 1.3 km || 
|-id=440 bgcolor=#E9E9E9
| 237440 ||  || — || September 9, 1999 || Socorro || LINEAR || — || align=right | 1.5 km || 
|-id=441 bgcolor=#fefefe
| 237441 ||  || — || September 8, 1999 || Socorro || LINEAR || CHL || align=right | 3.3 km || 
|-id=442 bgcolor=#FFC2E0
| 237442 ||  || — || October 5, 1999 || Socorro || LINEAR || AMO +1km || align=right data-sort-value="0.85" | 850 m || 
|-id=443 bgcolor=#E9E9E9
| 237443 ||  || — || October 6, 1999 || Kitt Peak || Spacewatch || — || align=right | 2.3 km || 
|-id=444 bgcolor=#E9E9E9
| 237444 ||  || — || October 8, 1999 || Kitt Peak || Spacewatch || EUN || align=right | 1.8 km || 
|-id=445 bgcolor=#E9E9E9
| 237445 ||  || — || October 10, 1999 || Kitt Peak || Spacewatch || — || align=right | 2.1 km || 
|-id=446 bgcolor=#E9E9E9
| 237446 ||  || — || October 10, 1999 || Kitt Peak || Spacewatch || — || align=right | 1.6 km || 
|-id=447 bgcolor=#E9E9E9
| 237447 ||  || — || October 15, 1999 || Kitt Peak || Spacewatch || — || align=right | 1.0 km || 
|-id=448 bgcolor=#E9E9E9
| 237448 ||  || — || October 6, 1999 || Socorro || LINEAR || — || align=right | 2.0 km || 
|-id=449 bgcolor=#E9E9E9
| 237449 ||  || — || October 15, 1999 || Socorro || LINEAR || — || align=right | 1.8 km || 
|-id=450 bgcolor=#E9E9E9
| 237450 ||  || — || October 11, 1999 || Socorro || LINEAR || — || align=right | 1.5 km || 
|-id=451 bgcolor=#E9E9E9
| 237451 ||  || — || October 15, 1999 || Socorro || LINEAR || — || align=right | 1.6 km || 
|-id=452 bgcolor=#E9E9E9
| 237452 ||  || — || October 15, 1999 || Socorro || LINEAR || — || align=right | 3.5 km || 
|-id=453 bgcolor=#d6d6d6
| 237453 ||  || — || October 3, 1999 || Socorro || LINEAR || — || align=right | 7.0 km || 
|-id=454 bgcolor=#E9E9E9
| 237454 ||  || — || November 5, 1999 || Socorro || LINEAR || — || align=right | 2.8 km || 
|-id=455 bgcolor=#E9E9E9
| 237455 ||  || — || November 9, 1999 || Socorro || LINEAR || — || align=right | 2.9 km || 
|-id=456 bgcolor=#E9E9E9
| 237456 ||  || — || November 3, 1999 || Kitt Peak || Spacewatch || — || align=right | 2.8 km || 
|-id=457 bgcolor=#E9E9E9
| 237457 ||  || — || November 9, 1999 || Kitt Peak || Spacewatch || HOF || align=right | 2.9 km || 
|-id=458 bgcolor=#E9E9E9
| 237458 ||  || — || November 9, 1999 || Kitt Peak || Spacewatch || — || align=right | 2.1 km || 
|-id=459 bgcolor=#E9E9E9
| 237459 ||  || — || November 10, 1999 || Kitt Peak || Spacewatch || AGN || align=right | 1.5 km || 
|-id=460 bgcolor=#E9E9E9
| 237460 ||  || — || November 14, 1999 || Socorro || LINEAR || BRU || align=right | 4.6 km || 
|-id=461 bgcolor=#E9E9E9
| 237461 ||  || — || November 9, 1999 || Socorro || LINEAR || — || align=right | 4.1 km || 
|-id=462 bgcolor=#E9E9E9
| 237462 ||  || — || November 10, 1999 || Kitt Peak || Spacewatch || — || align=right | 2.3 km || 
|-id=463 bgcolor=#d6d6d6
| 237463 ||  || — || December 10, 1999 || Socorro || LINEAR || — || align=right | 2.2 km || 
|-id=464 bgcolor=#E9E9E9
| 237464 ||  || — || December 15, 1999 || Kitt Peak || Spacewatch || — || align=right | 2.8 km || 
|-id=465 bgcolor=#FA8072
| 237465 ||  || — || December 29, 1999 || Mauna Kea || C. Veillet || — || align=right data-sort-value="0.62" | 620 m || 
|-id=466 bgcolor=#fefefe
| 237466 ||  || — || January 4, 2000 || Socorro || LINEAR || — || align=right data-sort-value="0.99" | 990 m || 
|-id=467 bgcolor=#E9E9E9
| 237467 ||  || — || January 27, 2000 || Kitt Peak || Spacewatch || HOF || align=right | 3.8 km || 
|-id=468 bgcolor=#fefefe
| 237468 ||  || — || January 30, 2000 || Kitt Peak || Spacewatch || — || align=right data-sort-value="0.85" | 850 m || 
|-id=469 bgcolor=#E9E9E9
| 237469 ||  || — || January 27, 2000 || Kitt Peak || Spacewatch || — || align=right | 2.2 km || 
|-id=470 bgcolor=#E9E9E9
| 237470 ||  || — || February 4, 2000 || Kitt Peak || Spacewatch || — || align=right | 2.6 km || 
|-id=471 bgcolor=#E9E9E9
| 237471 ||  || — || February 29, 2000 || Socorro || LINEAR || — || align=right | 2.1 km || 
|-id=472 bgcolor=#fefefe
| 237472 ||  || — || February 29, 2000 || Socorro || LINEAR || NYS || align=right | 2.0 km || 
|-id=473 bgcolor=#d6d6d6
| 237473 ||  || — || March 3, 2000 || Socorro || LINEAR || — || align=right | 4.2 km || 
|-id=474 bgcolor=#fefefe
| 237474 ||  || — || March 9, 2000 || Socorro || LINEAR || FLO || align=right | 1.2 km || 
|-id=475 bgcolor=#fefefe
| 237475 ||  || — || March 29, 2000 || Kitt Peak || Spacewatch || FLO || align=right | 1.8 km || 
|-id=476 bgcolor=#d6d6d6
| 237476 ||  || — || March 29, 2000 || Socorro || LINEAR || — || align=right | 5.8 km || 
|-id=477 bgcolor=#fefefe
| 237477 ||  || — || March 29, 2000 || Socorro || LINEAR || PHO || align=right | 1.1 km || 
|-id=478 bgcolor=#fefefe
| 237478 ||  || — || April 5, 2000 || Socorro || LINEAR || FLO || align=right data-sort-value="0.77" | 770 m || 
|-id=479 bgcolor=#fefefe
| 237479 ||  || — || April 5, 2000 || Socorro || LINEAR || — || align=right | 1.1 km || 
|-id=480 bgcolor=#fefefe
| 237480 ||  || — || April 4, 2000 || Socorro || LINEAR || H || align=right | 1.0 km || 
|-id=481 bgcolor=#d6d6d6
| 237481 ||  || — || April 7, 2000 || Kitt Peak || Spacewatch || — || align=right | 3.6 km || 
|-id=482 bgcolor=#fefefe
| 237482 ||  || — || April 25, 2000 || Kitt Peak || Spacewatch || — || align=right | 1.3 km || 
|-id=483 bgcolor=#fefefe
| 237483 ||  || — || April 28, 2000 || Socorro || LINEAR || PHO || align=right | 1.6 km || 
|-id=484 bgcolor=#fefefe
| 237484 ||  || — || April 29, 2000 || Socorro || LINEAR || — || align=right | 1.2 km || 
|-id=485 bgcolor=#fefefe
| 237485 ||  || — || April 26, 2000 || Anderson Mesa || LONEOS || FLO || align=right data-sort-value="0.91" | 910 m || 
|-id=486 bgcolor=#FA8072
| 237486 ||  || — || May 26, 2000 || Socorro || LINEAR || — || align=right | 1.8 km || 
|-id=487 bgcolor=#fefefe
| 237487 ||  || — || May 28, 2000 || Socorro || LINEAR || V || align=right data-sort-value="0.83" | 830 m || 
|-id=488 bgcolor=#fefefe
| 237488 ||  || — || May 27, 2000 || Socorro || LINEAR || — || align=right | 1.0 km || 
|-id=489 bgcolor=#fefefe
| 237489 ||  || — || June 6, 2000 || Kitt Peak || Spacewatch || — || align=right | 1.1 km || 
|-id=490 bgcolor=#fefefe
| 237490 ||  || — || June 4, 2000 || Kitt Peak || Spacewatch || FLO || align=right | 1.4 km || 
|-id=491 bgcolor=#fefefe
| 237491 ||  || — || July 30, 2000 || Socorro || LINEAR || — || align=right | 2.5 km || 
|-id=492 bgcolor=#fefefe
| 237492 ||  || — || July 30, 2000 || Socorro || LINEAR || V || align=right | 1.2 km || 
|-id=493 bgcolor=#fefefe
| 237493 ||  || — || August 26, 2000 || Socorro || LINEAR || — || align=right | 1.0 km || 
|-id=494 bgcolor=#fefefe
| 237494 ||  || — || August 26, 2000 || Prescott || P. G. Comba || — || align=right | 1.3 km || 
|-id=495 bgcolor=#FA8072
| 237495 ||  || — || August 26, 2000 || Socorro || LINEAR || — || align=right | 2.1 km || 
|-id=496 bgcolor=#fefefe
| 237496 ||  || — || August 24, 2000 || Socorro || LINEAR || FLO || align=right data-sort-value="0.83" | 830 m || 
|-id=497 bgcolor=#fefefe
| 237497 ||  || — || August 24, 2000 || Socorro || LINEAR || V || align=right data-sort-value="0.82" | 820 m || 
|-id=498 bgcolor=#fefefe
| 237498 ||  || — || August 25, 2000 || Socorro || LINEAR || — || align=right | 1.5 km || 
|-id=499 bgcolor=#d6d6d6
| 237499 ||  || — || August 28, 2000 || Socorro || LINEAR || — || align=right | 5.5 km || 
|-id=500 bgcolor=#fefefe
| 237500 ||  || — || August 26, 2000 || Socorro || LINEAR || — || align=right | 1.1 km || 
|}

237501–237600 

|-bgcolor=#fefefe
| 237501 ||  || — || August 31, 2000 || Socorro || LINEAR || — || align=right | 1.3 km || 
|-id=502 bgcolor=#E9E9E9
| 237502 ||  || — || August 31, 2000 || Socorro || LINEAR || — || align=right | 2.9 km || 
|-id=503 bgcolor=#fefefe
| 237503 ||  || — || August 26, 2000 || Socorro || LINEAR || — || align=right | 1.3 km || 
|-id=504 bgcolor=#fefefe
| 237504 ||  || — || August 26, 2000 || Socorro || LINEAR || — || align=right | 1.4 km || 
|-id=505 bgcolor=#d6d6d6
| 237505 ||  || — || August 26, 2000 || Socorro || LINEAR || THB || align=right | 4.7 km || 
|-id=506 bgcolor=#fefefe
| 237506 ||  || — || September 1, 2000 || Socorro || LINEAR || — || align=right | 1.6 km || 
|-id=507 bgcolor=#fefefe
| 237507 ||  || — || September 1, 2000 || Socorro || LINEAR || — || align=right | 1.5 km || 
|-id=508 bgcolor=#fefefe
| 237508 ||  || — || September 5, 2000 || Socorro || LINEAR || — || align=right | 2.1 km || 
|-id=509 bgcolor=#fefefe
| 237509 ||  || — || September 8, 2000 || Črni Vrh || Črni Vrh || — || align=right | 1.5 km || 
|-id=510 bgcolor=#fefefe
| 237510 ||  || — || September 2, 2000 || Socorro || LINEAR || — || align=right | 1.4 km || 
|-id=511 bgcolor=#d6d6d6
| 237511 ||  || — || September 3, 2000 || Socorro || LINEAR || EUP || align=right | 6.2 km || 
|-id=512 bgcolor=#d6d6d6
| 237512 ||  || — || September 5, 2000 || Anderson Mesa || LONEOS || EUP || align=right | 8.2 km || 
|-id=513 bgcolor=#E9E9E9
| 237513 ||  || — || September 5, 2000 || Anderson Mesa || LONEOS || GER || align=right | 3.1 km || 
|-id=514 bgcolor=#E9E9E9
| 237514 ||  || — || September 20, 2000 || Socorro || LINEAR || — || align=right | 3.4 km || 
|-id=515 bgcolor=#fefefe
| 237515 ||  || — || September 21, 2000 || Socorro || LINEAR || — || align=right | 1.2 km || 
|-id=516 bgcolor=#E9E9E9
| 237516 ||  || — || September 23, 2000 || Socorro || LINEAR || ADE || align=right | 3.8 km || 
|-id=517 bgcolor=#fefefe
| 237517 ||  || — || September 24, 2000 || Socorro || LINEAR || V || align=right data-sort-value="0.94" | 940 m || 
|-id=518 bgcolor=#E9E9E9
| 237518 ||  || — || September 22, 2000 || Socorro || LINEAR || — || align=right | 3.9 km || 
|-id=519 bgcolor=#d6d6d6
| 237519 ||  || — || September 23, 2000 || Socorro || LINEAR || EUP || align=right | 5.6 km || 
|-id=520 bgcolor=#d6d6d6
| 237520 ||  || — || September 23, 2000 || Socorro || LINEAR || — || align=right | 4.7 km || 
|-id=521 bgcolor=#fefefe
| 237521 ||  || — || September 24, 2000 || Socorro || LINEAR || MAS || align=right | 1.4 km || 
|-id=522 bgcolor=#d6d6d6
| 237522 ||  || — || September 24, 2000 || Socorro || LINEAR || — || align=right | 4.4 km || 
|-id=523 bgcolor=#E9E9E9
| 237523 ||  || — || September 22, 2000 || Socorro || LINEAR || — || align=right | 2.3 km || 
|-id=524 bgcolor=#fefefe
| 237524 ||  || — || September 24, 2000 || Socorro || LINEAR || NYS || align=right | 3.0 km || 
|-id=525 bgcolor=#E9E9E9
| 237525 ||  || — || September 24, 2000 || Socorro || LINEAR || — || align=right | 1.4 km || 
|-id=526 bgcolor=#fefefe
| 237526 ||  || — || September 26, 2000 || Socorro || LINEAR || V || align=right | 1.1 km || 
|-id=527 bgcolor=#E9E9E9
| 237527 ||  || — || September 27, 2000 || Socorro || LINEAR || — || align=right | 3.1 km || 
|-id=528 bgcolor=#fefefe
| 237528 ||  || — || September 27, 2000 || Socorro || LINEAR || V || align=right | 1.1 km || 
|-id=529 bgcolor=#d6d6d6
| 237529 ||  || — || September 23, 2000 || Socorro || LINEAR || — || align=right | 5.4 km || 
|-id=530 bgcolor=#E9E9E9
| 237530 ||  || — || September 23, 2000 || Socorro || LINEAR || — || align=right | 1.5 km || 
|-id=531 bgcolor=#E9E9E9
| 237531 ||  || — || September 27, 2000 || Socorro || LINEAR || — || align=right | 1.4 km || 
|-id=532 bgcolor=#d6d6d6
| 237532 ||  || — || September 28, 2000 || Socorro || LINEAR || — || align=right | 5.9 km || 
|-id=533 bgcolor=#E9E9E9
| 237533 ||  || — || September 30, 2000 || Socorro || LINEAR || — || align=right | 4.8 km || 
|-id=534 bgcolor=#fefefe
| 237534 ||  || — || September 28, 2000 || Kitt Peak || Spacewatch || NYS || align=right data-sort-value="0.86" | 860 m || 
|-id=535 bgcolor=#E9E9E9
| 237535 ||  || — || September 29, 2000 || Anderson Mesa || LONEOS || — || align=right | 3.5 km || 
|-id=536 bgcolor=#fefefe
| 237536 ||  || — || October 1, 2000 || Socorro || LINEAR || ERI || align=right | 2.5 km || 
|-id=537 bgcolor=#fefefe
| 237537 ||  || — || October 1, 2000 || Socorro || LINEAR || MAS || align=right | 1.1 km || 
|-id=538 bgcolor=#fefefe
| 237538 ||  || — || October 1, 2000 || Socorro || LINEAR || — || align=right | 1.2 km || 
|-id=539 bgcolor=#d6d6d6
| 237539 ||  || — || October 2, 2000 || Socorro || LINEAR || — || align=right | 4.2 km || 
|-id=540 bgcolor=#fefefe
| 237540 ||  || — || October 20, 2000 || Ondřejov || P. Kušnirák || H || align=right data-sort-value="0.76" | 760 m || 
|-id=541 bgcolor=#E9E9E9
| 237541 ||  || — || October 24, 2000 || Socorro || LINEAR || — || align=right | 2.4 km || 
|-id=542 bgcolor=#fefefe
| 237542 ||  || — || October 24, 2000 || Socorro || LINEAR || H || align=right | 1.3 km || 
|-id=543 bgcolor=#E9E9E9
| 237543 ||  || — || October 25, 2000 || Socorro || LINEAR || — || align=right | 2.9 km || 
|-id=544 bgcolor=#fefefe
| 237544 ||  || — || October 24, 2000 || Socorro || LINEAR || — || align=right | 1.1 km || 
|-id=545 bgcolor=#fefefe
| 237545 ||  || — || October 24, 2000 || Socorro || LINEAR || NYS || align=right | 1.1 km || 
|-id=546 bgcolor=#fefefe
| 237546 ||  || — || October 25, 2000 || Socorro || LINEAR || H || align=right | 1.2 km || 
|-id=547 bgcolor=#fefefe
| 237547 ||  || — || October 24, 2000 || Socorro || LINEAR || V || align=right | 1.2 km || 
|-id=548 bgcolor=#d6d6d6
| 237548 ||  || — || October 31, 2000 || Socorro || LINEAR || — || align=right | 6.5 km || 
|-id=549 bgcolor=#fefefe
| 237549 ||  || — || October 31, 2000 || Socorro || LINEAR || NYS || align=right | 1.1 km || 
|-id=550 bgcolor=#E9E9E9
| 237550 ||  || — || October 25, 2000 || Socorro || LINEAR || — || align=right | 3.2 km || 
|-id=551 bgcolor=#FFC2E0
| 237551 ||  || — || November 21, 2000 || Socorro || LINEAR || APO || align=right data-sort-value="0.63" | 630 m || 
|-id=552 bgcolor=#E9E9E9
| 237552 ||  || — || November 20, 2000 || Socorro || LINEAR || — || align=right | 4.9 km || 
|-id=553 bgcolor=#E9E9E9
| 237553 ||  || — || November 20, 2000 || Socorro || LINEAR || — || align=right | 1.7 km || 
|-id=554 bgcolor=#d6d6d6
| 237554 ||  || — || November 20, 2000 || Socorro || LINEAR || — || align=right | 6.8 km || 
|-id=555 bgcolor=#fefefe
| 237555 ||  || — || November 20, 2000 || Kitt Peak || Spacewatch || — || align=right | 1.6 km || 
|-id=556 bgcolor=#E9E9E9
| 237556 ||  || — || November 30, 2000 || Socorro || LINEAR || — || align=right | 2.4 km || 
|-id=557 bgcolor=#E9E9E9
| 237557 ||  || — || November 25, 2000 || Socorro || LINEAR || — || align=right | 3.1 km || 
|-id=558 bgcolor=#E9E9E9
| 237558 ||  || — || December 15, 2000 || Socorro || LINEAR || — || align=right | 3.6 km || 
|-id=559 bgcolor=#E9E9E9
| 237559 ||  || — || December 20, 2000 || Socorro || LINEAR || — || align=right | 3.7 km || 
|-id=560 bgcolor=#E9E9E9
| 237560 ||  || — || December 23, 2000 || Kitt Peak || Spacewatch || — || align=right | 1.8 km || 
|-id=561 bgcolor=#E9E9E9
| 237561 ||  || — || December 23, 2000 || Socorro || LINEAR || BRG || align=right | 2.5 km || 
|-id=562 bgcolor=#E9E9E9
| 237562 ||  || — || December 30, 2000 || Socorro || LINEAR || — || align=right | 1.4 km || 
|-id=563 bgcolor=#E9E9E9
| 237563 ||  || — || December 30, 2000 || Socorro || LINEAR || — || align=right | 1.7 km || 
|-id=564 bgcolor=#E9E9E9
| 237564 ||  || — || December 29, 2000 || Anderson Mesa || LONEOS || MIT || align=right | 4.5 km || 
|-id=565 bgcolor=#E9E9E9
| 237565 ||  || — || January 2, 2001 || Socorro || LINEAR || — || align=right | 1.5 km || 
|-id=566 bgcolor=#FA8072
| 237566 ||  || — || January 16, 2001 || Haleakala || NEAT || — || align=right | 2.0 km || 
|-id=567 bgcolor=#E9E9E9
| 237567 ||  || — || January 18, 2001 || Socorro || LINEAR || BRG || align=right | 2.3 km || 
|-id=568 bgcolor=#E9E9E9
| 237568 ||  || — || January 19, 2001 || Socorro || LINEAR || PAE || align=right | 2.2 km || 
|-id=569 bgcolor=#E9E9E9
| 237569 ||  || — || January 19, 2001 || Socorro || LINEAR || — || align=right | 2.4 km || 
|-id=570 bgcolor=#E9E9E9
| 237570 ||  || — || January 20, 2001 || Haleakala || NEAT || — || align=right | 2.6 km || 
|-id=571 bgcolor=#E9E9E9
| 237571 ||  || — || February 2, 2001 || Socorro || LINEAR || — || align=right | 3.4 km || 
|-id=572 bgcolor=#E9E9E9
| 237572 ||  || — || February 16, 2001 || Kitt Peak || Spacewatch || — || align=right | 1.7 km || 
|-id=573 bgcolor=#E9E9E9
| 237573 ||  || — || February 17, 2001 || Socorro || LINEAR || — || align=right | 2.2 km || 
|-id=574 bgcolor=#E9E9E9
| 237574 ||  || — || February 19, 2001 || Nogales || Tenagra II Obs. || — || align=right | 2.1 km || 
|-id=575 bgcolor=#E9E9E9
| 237575 ||  || — || February 16, 2001 || Socorro || LINEAR || — || align=right | 3.0 km || 
|-id=576 bgcolor=#E9E9E9
| 237576 ||  || — || February 17, 2001 || Socorro || LINEAR || — || align=right | 1.9 km || 
|-id=577 bgcolor=#E9E9E9
| 237577 ||  || — || February 17, 2001 || Socorro || LINEAR || INO || align=right | 1.4 km || 
|-id=578 bgcolor=#E9E9E9
| 237578 ||  || — || February 19, 2001 || Socorro || LINEAR || — || align=right | 1.7 km || 
|-id=579 bgcolor=#E9E9E9
| 237579 ||  || — || February 19, 2001 || Socorro || LINEAR || MIT || align=right | 4.6 km || 
|-id=580 bgcolor=#E9E9E9
| 237580 ||  || — || February 16, 2001 || Anderson Mesa || LONEOS || — || align=right | 3.8 km || 
|-id=581 bgcolor=#E9E9E9
| 237581 ||  || — || February 16, 2001 || Socorro || LINEAR || ADE || align=right | 4.1 km || 
|-id=582 bgcolor=#E9E9E9
| 237582 ||  || — || March 15, 2001 || Socorro || LINEAR || ADE || align=right | 4.1 km || 
|-id=583 bgcolor=#E9E9E9
| 237583 ||  || — || March 19, 2001 || Kitt Peak || Spacewatch || JUN || align=right | 1.4 km || 
|-id=584 bgcolor=#E9E9E9
| 237584 ||  || — || March 19, 2001 || Anderson Mesa || LONEOS || JUN || align=right | 2.8 km || 
|-id=585 bgcolor=#E9E9E9
| 237585 ||  || — || March 19, 2001 || Anderson Mesa || LONEOS || EUN || align=right | 1.8 km || 
|-id=586 bgcolor=#E9E9E9
| 237586 ||  || — || March 19, 2001 || Anderson Mesa || LONEOS || JUN || align=right | 1.7 km || 
|-id=587 bgcolor=#E9E9E9
| 237587 ||  || — || March 18, 2001 || Socorro || LINEAR || — || align=right | 3.0 km || 
|-id=588 bgcolor=#E9E9E9
| 237588 ||  || — || March 18, 2001 || Socorro || LINEAR || — || align=right | 2.8 km || 
|-id=589 bgcolor=#E9E9E9
| 237589 ||  || — || March 17, 2001 || Socorro || LINEAR || — || align=right | 3.3 km || 
|-id=590 bgcolor=#E9E9E9
| 237590 ||  || — || March 19, 2001 || Anderson Mesa || LONEOS || — || align=right | 3.1 km || 
|-id=591 bgcolor=#E9E9E9
| 237591 ||  || — || March 20, 2001 || Haleakala || NEAT || — || align=right | 3.7 km || 
|-id=592 bgcolor=#E9E9E9
| 237592 ||  || — || March 18, 2001 || Socorro || LINEAR || ADE || align=right | 2.7 km || 
|-id=593 bgcolor=#E9E9E9
| 237593 ||  || — || March 20, 2001 || Anderson Mesa || LONEOS || — || align=right | 2.7 km || 
|-id=594 bgcolor=#E9E9E9
| 237594 ||  || — || March 20, 2001 || Anderson Mesa || LONEOS || — || align=right | 2.3 km || 
|-id=595 bgcolor=#E9E9E9
| 237595 ||  || — || April 14, 2001 || Socorro || LINEAR || JUN || align=right | 2.3 km || 
|-id=596 bgcolor=#d6d6d6
| 237596 ||  || — || May 23, 2001 || Bergisch Gladbac || W. Bickel || — || align=right | 4.6 km || 
|-id=597 bgcolor=#E9E9E9
| 237597 ||  || — || May 24, 2001 || Socorro || LINEAR || — || align=right | 3.7 km || 
|-id=598 bgcolor=#E9E9E9
| 237598 ||  || — || May 27, 2001 || Kitt Peak || Spacewatch || — || align=right | 2.8 km || 
|-id=599 bgcolor=#fefefe
| 237599 ||  || — || July 19, 2001 || Palomar || NEAT || — || align=right | 1.3 km || 
|-id=600 bgcolor=#d6d6d6
| 237600 ||  || — || July 17, 2001 || Anderson Mesa || LONEOS || — || align=right | 3.6 km || 
|}

237601–237700 

|-bgcolor=#d6d6d6
| 237601 ||  || — || July 21, 2001 || Haleakala || NEAT || — || align=right | 3.9 km || 
|-id=602 bgcolor=#E9E9E9
| 237602 ||  || — || August 11, 2001 || Palomar || NEAT || DOR || align=right | 3.4 km || 
|-id=603 bgcolor=#d6d6d6
| 237603 ||  || — || August 11, 2001 || Palomar || NEAT || — || align=right | 5.1 km || 
|-id=604 bgcolor=#d6d6d6
| 237604 ||  || — || August 11, 2001 || Haleakala || NEAT || — || align=right | 3.3 km || 
|-id=605 bgcolor=#d6d6d6
| 237605 ||  || — || August 15, 2001 || Haleakala || NEAT || URS || align=right | 7.6 km || 
|-id=606 bgcolor=#fefefe
| 237606 ||  || — || August 16, 2001 || Socorro || LINEAR || — || align=right | 1.0 km || 
|-id=607 bgcolor=#E9E9E9
| 237607 ||  || — || August 21, 2001 || Emerald Lane || L. Ball || — || align=right | 3.1 km || 
|-id=608 bgcolor=#d6d6d6
| 237608 ||  || — || August 16, 2001 || Socorro || LINEAR || TIR || align=right | 7.8 km || 
|-id=609 bgcolor=#d6d6d6
| 237609 ||  || — || August 19, 2001 || Haleakala || NEAT || TIR || align=right | 5.0 km || 
|-id=610 bgcolor=#FA8072
| 237610 ||  || — || August 24, 2001 || Socorro || LINEAR || — || align=right | 1.3 km || 
|-id=611 bgcolor=#d6d6d6
| 237611 ||  || — || August 25, 2001 || Socorro || LINEAR || — || align=right | 4.2 km || 
|-id=612 bgcolor=#d6d6d6
| 237612 ||  || — || August 24, 2001 || Anderson Mesa || LONEOS || — || align=right | 6.4 km || 
|-id=613 bgcolor=#fefefe
| 237613 ||  || — || August 24, 2001 || Socorro || LINEAR || FLO || align=right data-sort-value="0.99" | 990 m || 
|-id=614 bgcolor=#fefefe
| 237614 ||  || — || August 25, 2001 || Socorro || LINEAR || — || align=right | 3.9 km || 
|-id=615 bgcolor=#fefefe
| 237615 ||  || — || August 19, 2001 || Socorro || LINEAR || — || align=right | 3.0 km || 
|-id=616 bgcolor=#FA8072
| 237616 ||  || — || September 8, 2001 || Socorro || LINEAR || — || align=right data-sort-value="0.88" | 880 m || 
|-id=617 bgcolor=#d6d6d6
| 237617 ||  || — || September 7, 2001 || Socorro || LINEAR || — || align=right | 3.4 km || 
|-id=618 bgcolor=#fefefe
| 237618 ||  || — || September 8, 2001 || Socorro || LINEAR || ERI || align=right | 2.8 km || 
|-id=619 bgcolor=#fefefe
| 237619 ||  || — || September 12, 2001 || Socorro || LINEAR || — || align=right data-sort-value="0.81" | 810 m || 
|-id=620 bgcolor=#d6d6d6
| 237620 ||  || — || September 12, 2001 || Socorro || LINEAR || HYG || align=right | 3.7 km || 
|-id=621 bgcolor=#d6d6d6
| 237621 ||  || — || September 12, 2001 || Socorro || LINEAR || — || align=right | 3.4 km || 
|-id=622 bgcolor=#d6d6d6
| 237622 ||  || — || September 10, 2001 || Socorro || LINEAR || EUP || align=right | 5.7 km || 
|-id=623 bgcolor=#d6d6d6
| 237623 ||  || — || September 12, 2001 || Socorro || LINEAR || EOS || align=right | 3.8 km || 
|-id=624 bgcolor=#fefefe
| 237624 ||  || — || September 12, 2001 || Socorro || LINEAR || — || align=right | 1.1 km || 
|-id=625 bgcolor=#d6d6d6
| 237625 ||  || — || September 12, 2001 || Socorro || LINEAR || THM || align=right | 4.0 km || 
|-id=626 bgcolor=#fefefe
| 237626 ||  || — || September 12, 2001 || Socorro || LINEAR || FLO || align=right data-sort-value="0.86" | 860 m || 
|-id=627 bgcolor=#d6d6d6
| 237627 ||  || — || September 12, 2001 || Socorro || LINEAR || — || align=right | 5.2 km || 
|-id=628 bgcolor=#fefefe
| 237628 ||  || — || September 12, 2001 || Socorro || LINEAR || — || align=right | 1.0 km || 
|-id=629 bgcolor=#d6d6d6
| 237629 ||  || — || September 12, 2001 || Socorro || LINEAR || EOS || align=right | 3.0 km || 
|-id=630 bgcolor=#d6d6d6
| 237630 ||  || — || September 9, 2001 || Palomar || NEAT || LIX || align=right | 5.4 km || 
|-id=631 bgcolor=#fefefe
| 237631 ||  || — || September 11, 2001 || Anderson Mesa || LONEOS || — || align=right | 2.3 km || 
|-id=632 bgcolor=#d6d6d6
| 237632 ||  || — || September 16, 2001 || Socorro || LINEAR || IMH || align=right | 4.7 km || 
|-id=633 bgcolor=#fefefe
| 237633 ||  || — || September 16, 2001 || Socorro || LINEAR || — || align=right data-sort-value="0.98" | 980 m || 
|-id=634 bgcolor=#d6d6d6
| 237634 ||  || — || September 16, 2001 || Socorro || LINEAR || — || align=right | 4.6 km || 
|-id=635 bgcolor=#d6d6d6
| 237635 ||  || — || September 16, 2001 || Socorro || LINEAR || — || align=right | 3.4 km || 
|-id=636 bgcolor=#fefefe
| 237636 ||  || — || September 16, 2001 || Socorro || LINEAR || — || align=right | 1.2 km || 
|-id=637 bgcolor=#fefefe
| 237637 ||  || — || September 17, 2001 || Socorro || LINEAR || — || align=right | 1.2 km || 
|-id=638 bgcolor=#fefefe
| 237638 ||  || — || September 17, 2001 || Socorro || LINEAR || — || align=right | 1.1 km || 
|-id=639 bgcolor=#d6d6d6
| 237639 ||  || — || September 20, 2001 || Socorro || LINEAR || — || align=right | 6.9 km || 
|-id=640 bgcolor=#fefefe
| 237640 ||  || — || September 20, 2001 || Socorro || LINEAR || — || align=right | 1.2 km || 
|-id=641 bgcolor=#fefefe
| 237641 ||  || — || September 20, 2001 || Socorro || LINEAR || — || align=right data-sort-value="0.91" | 910 m || 
|-id=642 bgcolor=#d6d6d6
| 237642 ||  || — || September 20, 2001 || Socorro || LINEAR || — || align=right | 4.3 km || 
|-id=643 bgcolor=#d6d6d6
| 237643 ||  || — || September 20, 2001 || Socorro || LINEAR || — || align=right | 3.3 km || 
|-id=644 bgcolor=#d6d6d6
| 237644 ||  || — || September 20, 2001 || Socorro || LINEAR || — || align=right | 4.1 km || 
|-id=645 bgcolor=#d6d6d6
| 237645 ||  || — || September 16, 2001 || Socorro || LINEAR || — || align=right | 5.0 km || 
|-id=646 bgcolor=#d6d6d6
| 237646 ||  || — || September 16, 2001 || Socorro || LINEAR || — || align=right | 5.2 km || 
|-id=647 bgcolor=#fefefe
| 237647 ||  || — || September 16, 2001 || Socorro || LINEAR || — || align=right | 1.2 km || 
|-id=648 bgcolor=#fefefe
| 237648 ||  || — || September 17, 2001 || Socorro || LINEAR || FLO || align=right data-sort-value="0.80" | 800 m || 
|-id=649 bgcolor=#d6d6d6
| 237649 ||  || — || September 17, 2001 || Socorro || LINEAR || EOS || align=right | 4.9 km || 
|-id=650 bgcolor=#fefefe
| 237650 ||  || — || September 17, 2001 || Socorro || LINEAR || — || align=right | 1.2 km || 
|-id=651 bgcolor=#d6d6d6
| 237651 ||  || — || September 17, 2001 || Socorro || LINEAR || EOS || align=right | 3.6 km || 
|-id=652 bgcolor=#d6d6d6
| 237652 ||  || — || September 17, 2001 || Socorro || LINEAR || TIR || align=right | 5.4 km || 
|-id=653 bgcolor=#fefefe
| 237653 ||  || — || September 19, 2001 || Socorro || LINEAR || — || align=right | 3.2 km || 
|-id=654 bgcolor=#fefefe
| 237654 ||  || — || September 19, 2001 || Socorro || LINEAR || NYS || align=right | 1.0 km || 
|-id=655 bgcolor=#fefefe
| 237655 ||  || — || September 16, 2001 || Socorro || LINEAR || — || align=right data-sort-value="0.84" | 840 m || 
|-id=656 bgcolor=#d6d6d6
| 237656 ||  || — || September 19, 2001 || Socorro || LINEAR || — || align=right | 7.2 km || 
|-id=657 bgcolor=#d6d6d6
| 237657 ||  || — || September 19, 2001 || Socorro || LINEAR || THM || align=right | 3.1 km || 
|-id=658 bgcolor=#fefefe
| 237658 ||  || — || September 19, 2001 || Socorro || LINEAR || — || align=right data-sort-value="0.91" | 910 m || 
|-id=659 bgcolor=#fefefe
| 237659 ||  || — || September 19, 2001 || Socorro || LINEAR || FLO || align=right data-sort-value="0.64" | 640 m || 
|-id=660 bgcolor=#fefefe
| 237660 ||  || — || September 19, 2001 || Socorro || LINEAR || NYS || align=right data-sort-value="0.89" | 890 m || 
|-id=661 bgcolor=#fefefe
| 237661 ||  || — || September 19, 2001 || Socorro || LINEAR || — || align=right | 1.5 km || 
|-id=662 bgcolor=#d6d6d6
| 237662 ||  || — || September 19, 2001 || Socorro || LINEAR || — || align=right | 4.4 km || 
|-id=663 bgcolor=#fefefe
| 237663 ||  || — || September 19, 2001 || Socorro || LINEAR || NYS || align=right data-sort-value="0.66" | 660 m || 
|-id=664 bgcolor=#fefefe
| 237664 ||  || — || September 19, 2001 || Socorro || LINEAR || FLO || align=right data-sort-value="0.91" | 910 m || 
|-id=665 bgcolor=#d6d6d6
| 237665 ||  || — || September 19, 2001 || Socorro || LINEAR || — || align=right | 6.6 km || 
|-id=666 bgcolor=#d6d6d6
| 237666 ||  || — || September 19, 2001 || Socorro || LINEAR || HYG || align=right | 3.9 km || 
|-id=667 bgcolor=#d6d6d6
| 237667 ||  || — || September 19, 2001 || Socorro || LINEAR || — || align=right | 5.8 km || 
|-id=668 bgcolor=#d6d6d6
| 237668 ||  || — || September 20, 2001 || Socorro || LINEAR || — || align=right | 5.7 km || 
|-id=669 bgcolor=#d6d6d6
| 237669 ||  || — || September 21, 2001 || Anderson Mesa || LONEOS || — || align=right | 6.5 km || 
|-id=670 bgcolor=#d6d6d6
| 237670 ||  || — || September 21, 2001 || Socorro || LINEAR || — || align=right | 3.7 km || 
|-id=671 bgcolor=#fefefe
| 237671 ||  || — || September 22, 2001 || Kitt Peak || Spacewatch || MAS || align=right data-sort-value="0.72" | 720 m || 
|-id=672 bgcolor=#d6d6d6
| 237672 ||  || — || September 18, 2001 || Kitt Peak || Spacewatch || — || align=right | 3.7 km || 
|-id=673 bgcolor=#d6d6d6
| 237673 ||  || — || September 28, 2001 || Palomar || NEAT || EOS || align=right | 3.9 km || 
|-id=674 bgcolor=#fefefe
| 237674 ||  || — || September 19, 2001 || Socorro || LINEAR || — || align=right | 1.00 km || 
|-id=675 bgcolor=#fefefe
| 237675 ||  || — || October 10, 2001 || Kitt Peak || Spacewatch || — || align=right | 1.1 km || 
|-id=676 bgcolor=#fefefe
| 237676 ||  || — || October 13, 2001 || Socorro || LINEAR || FLO || align=right data-sort-value="0.97" | 970 m || 
|-id=677 bgcolor=#d6d6d6
| 237677 ||  || — || October 13, 2001 || Socorro || LINEAR || — || align=right | 6.7 km || 
|-id=678 bgcolor=#d6d6d6
| 237678 ||  || — || October 13, 2001 || Socorro || LINEAR || — || align=right | 4.8 km || 
|-id=679 bgcolor=#d6d6d6
| 237679 ||  || — || October 13, 2001 || Socorro || LINEAR || — || align=right | 6.7 km || 
|-id=680 bgcolor=#fefefe
| 237680 ||  || — || October 14, 2001 || Socorro || LINEAR || — || align=right | 1.1 km || 
|-id=681 bgcolor=#fefefe
| 237681 ||  || — || October 14, 2001 || Socorro || LINEAR || FLO || align=right data-sort-value="0.67" | 670 m || 
|-id=682 bgcolor=#fefefe
| 237682 ||  || — || October 14, 2001 || Socorro || LINEAR || V || align=right | 1.1 km || 
|-id=683 bgcolor=#fefefe
| 237683 ||  || — || October 15, 2001 || Socorro || LINEAR || — || align=right | 3.7 km || 
|-id=684 bgcolor=#fefefe
| 237684 ||  || — || October 13, 2001 || Palomar || NEAT || — || align=right | 1.3 km || 
|-id=685 bgcolor=#d6d6d6
| 237685 ||  || — || October 14, 2001 || Kitt Peak || Spacewatch || NAE || align=right | 3.4 km || 
|-id=686 bgcolor=#d6d6d6
| 237686 ||  || — || October 11, 2001 || Palomar || NEAT || — || align=right | 3.3 km || 
|-id=687 bgcolor=#fefefe
| 237687 ||  || — || October 11, 2001 || Palomar || NEAT || V || align=right data-sort-value="0.68" | 680 m || 
|-id=688 bgcolor=#d6d6d6
| 237688 ||  || — || October 15, 2001 || Socorro || LINEAR || — || align=right | 4.6 km || 
|-id=689 bgcolor=#d6d6d6
| 237689 ||  || — || October 14, 2001 || Socorro || LINEAR || — || align=right | 3.5 km || 
|-id=690 bgcolor=#d6d6d6
| 237690 ||  || — || October 15, 2001 || Palomar || NEAT || — || align=right | 5.8 km || 
|-id=691 bgcolor=#fefefe
| 237691 ||  || — || October 11, 2001 || Socorro || LINEAR || — || align=right | 1.2 km || 
|-id=692 bgcolor=#d6d6d6
| 237692 ||  || — || October 14, 2001 || Apache Point || SDSS || — || align=right | 4.5 km || 
|-id=693 bgcolor=#d6d6d6
| 237693 Anakovacicek ||  ||  || October 14, 2001 || Apache Point || SDSS || HYG || align=right | 3.0 km || 
|-id=694 bgcolor=#d6d6d6
| 237694 ||  || — || October 14, 2001 || Apache Point || SDSS || TIR || align=right | 3.2 km || 
|-id=695 bgcolor=#d6d6d6
| 237695 ||  || — || October 16, 2001 || Socorro || LINEAR || — || align=right | 4.9 km || 
|-id=696 bgcolor=#d6d6d6
| 237696 ||  || — || October 17, 2001 || Socorro || LINEAR || — || align=right | 6.5 km || 
|-id=697 bgcolor=#fefefe
| 237697 ||  || — || October 17, 2001 || Socorro || LINEAR || FLO || align=right data-sort-value="0.78" | 780 m || 
|-id=698 bgcolor=#d6d6d6
| 237698 ||  || — || October 17, 2001 || Socorro || LINEAR || — || align=right | 5.0 km || 
|-id=699 bgcolor=#d6d6d6
| 237699 ||  || — || October 17, 2001 || Socorro || LINEAR || — || align=right | 2.8 km || 
|-id=700 bgcolor=#d6d6d6
| 237700 ||  || — || October 20, 2001 || Socorro || LINEAR || ALA || align=right | 6.1 km || 
|}

237701–237800 

|-bgcolor=#d6d6d6
| 237701 ||  || — || October 17, 2001 || Socorro || LINEAR || — || align=right | 5.1 km || 
|-id=702 bgcolor=#fefefe
| 237702 ||  || — || October 20, 2001 || Socorro || LINEAR || NYS || align=right data-sort-value="0.83" | 830 m || 
|-id=703 bgcolor=#fefefe
| 237703 ||  || — || October 20, 2001 || Socorro || LINEAR || — || align=right | 1.3 km || 
|-id=704 bgcolor=#d6d6d6
| 237704 ||  || — || October 16, 2001 || Kitt Peak || Spacewatch || — || align=right | 4.4 km || 
|-id=705 bgcolor=#d6d6d6
| 237705 ||  || — || October 17, 2001 || Socorro || LINEAR || HYG || align=right | 5.5 km || 
|-id=706 bgcolor=#d6d6d6
| 237706 ||  || — || October 21, 2001 || Socorro || LINEAR || — || align=right | 4.0 km || 
|-id=707 bgcolor=#fefefe
| 237707 ||  || — || October 23, 2001 || Socorro || LINEAR || FLO || align=right data-sort-value="0.90" | 900 m || 
|-id=708 bgcolor=#d6d6d6
| 237708 ||  || — || October 23, 2001 || Socorro || LINEAR || — || align=right | 4.6 km || 
|-id=709 bgcolor=#FA8072
| 237709 ||  || — || October 23, 2001 || Socorro || LINEAR || — || align=right | 1.5 km || 
|-id=710 bgcolor=#C2FFFF
| 237710 ||  || — || October 16, 2001 || Palomar || NEAT || L5 || align=right | 14 km || 
|-id=711 bgcolor=#d6d6d6
| 237711 ||  || — || October 18, 2001 || Palomar || NEAT || EOS || align=right | 2.7 km || 
|-id=712 bgcolor=#d6d6d6
| 237712 ||  || — || October 19, 2001 || Palomar || NEAT || — || align=right | 4.1 km || 
|-id=713 bgcolor=#d6d6d6
| 237713 ||  || — || October 19, 2001 || Haleakala || NEAT || — || align=right | 5.2 km || 
|-id=714 bgcolor=#fefefe
| 237714 ||  || — || October 21, 2001 || Socorro || LINEAR || — || align=right data-sort-value="0.96" | 960 m || 
|-id=715 bgcolor=#d6d6d6
| 237715 ||  || — || October 23, 2001 || Socorro || LINEAR || HYG || align=right | 4.8 km || 
|-id=716 bgcolor=#fefefe
| 237716 ||  || — || October 16, 2001 || Palomar || NEAT || FLO || align=right | 1.4 km || 
|-id=717 bgcolor=#fefefe
| 237717 ||  || — || November 10, 2001 || Socorro || LINEAR || — || align=right | 2.7 km || 
|-id=718 bgcolor=#fefefe
| 237718 ||  || — || November 10, 2001 || Socorro || LINEAR || — || align=right | 1.3 km || 
|-id=719 bgcolor=#d6d6d6
| 237719 ||  || — || November 11, 2001 || Apache Point || SDSS || EOS || align=right | 2.6 km || 
|-id=720 bgcolor=#fefefe
| 237720 ||  || — || November 11, 2001 || Apache Point || SDSS || — || align=right | 1.1 km || 
|-id=721 bgcolor=#d6d6d6
| 237721 ||  || — || November 16, 2001 || Kitt Peak || Spacewatch || — || align=right | 3.9 km || 
|-id=722 bgcolor=#fefefe
| 237722 ||  || — || November 17, 2001 || Socorro || LINEAR || MAS || align=right data-sort-value="0.96" | 960 m || 
|-id=723 bgcolor=#d6d6d6
| 237723 ||  || — || November 17, 2001 || Socorro || LINEAR || — || align=right | 6.0 km || 
|-id=724 bgcolor=#d6d6d6
| 237724 ||  || — || November 17, 2001 || Socorro || LINEAR || — || align=right | 3.4 km || 
|-id=725 bgcolor=#fefefe
| 237725 ||  || — || November 17, 2001 || Socorro || LINEAR || MAS || align=right data-sort-value="0.81" | 810 m || 
|-id=726 bgcolor=#d6d6d6
| 237726 ||  || — || November 17, 2001 || Socorro || LINEAR || — || align=right | 5.2 km || 
|-id=727 bgcolor=#fefefe
| 237727 ||  || — || November 19, 2001 || Socorro || LINEAR || — || align=right | 1.9 km || 
|-id=728 bgcolor=#d6d6d6
| 237728 ||  || — || November 19, 2001 || Socorro || LINEAR || — || align=right | 4.0 km || 
|-id=729 bgcolor=#fefefe
| 237729 ||  || — || November 20, 2001 || Socorro || LINEAR || — || align=right data-sort-value="0.93" | 930 m || 
|-id=730 bgcolor=#d6d6d6
| 237730 ||  || — || November 20, 2001 || Socorro || LINEAR || — || align=right | 3.4 km || 
|-id=731 bgcolor=#fefefe
| 237731 ||  || — || November 20, 2001 || Socorro || LINEAR || — || align=right data-sort-value="0.74" | 740 m || 
|-id=732 bgcolor=#fefefe
| 237732 ||  || — || November 21, 2001 || Socorro || LINEAR || — || align=right | 1.5 km || 
|-id=733 bgcolor=#fefefe
| 237733 ||  || — || November 17, 2001 || Socorro || LINEAR || V || align=right data-sort-value="0.92" | 920 m || 
|-id=734 bgcolor=#fefefe
| 237734 ||  || — || December 10, 2001 || Socorro || LINEAR || — || align=right | 3.0 km || 
|-id=735 bgcolor=#fefefe
| 237735 ||  || — || December 11, 2001 || Socorro || LINEAR || KLI || align=right | 2.3 km || 
|-id=736 bgcolor=#fefefe
| 237736 ||  || — || December 8, 2001 || Socorro || LINEAR || — || align=right data-sort-value="0.89" | 890 m || 
|-id=737 bgcolor=#fefefe
| 237737 ||  || — || December 10, 2001 || Socorro || LINEAR || NYS || align=right | 2.6 km || 
|-id=738 bgcolor=#d6d6d6
| 237738 ||  || — || December 11, 2001 || Socorro || LINEAR || EOS || align=right | 3.5 km || 
|-id=739 bgcolor=#fefefe
| 237739 ||  || — || December 11, 2001 || Socorro || LINEAR || — || align=right data-sort-value="0.94" | 940 m || 
|-id=740 bgcolor=#d6d6d6
| 237740 ||  || — || December 11, 2001 || Socorro || LINEAR || EUP || align=right | 6.9 km || 
|-id=741 bgcolor=#d6d6d6
| 237741 ||  || — || December 14, 2001 || Socorro || LINEAR || — || align=right | 6.0 km || 
|-id=742 bgcolor=#fefefe
| 237742 ||  || — || December 14, 2001 || Socorro || LINEAR || — || align=right | 1.8 km || 
|-id=743 bgcolor=#fefefe
| 237743 ||  || — || December 14, 2001 || Socorro || LINEAR || NYS || align=right data-sort-value="0.77" | 770 m || 
|-id=744 bgcolor=#fefefe
| 237744 ||  || — || December 14, 2001 || Socorro || LINEAR || — || align=right | 1.0 km || 
|-id=745 bgcolor=#fefefe
| 237745 ||  || — || December 14, 2001 || Socorro || LINEAR || — || align=right | 1.4 km || 
|-id=746 bgcolor=#fefefe
| 237746 ||  || — || December 14, 2001 || Socorro || LINEAR || V || align=right | 1.1 km || 
|-id=747 bgcolor=#fefefe
| 237747 ||  || — || December 14, 2001 || Socorro || LINEAR || NYS || align=right data-sort-value="0.91" | 910 m || 
|-id=748 bgcolor=#fefefe
| 237748 ||  || — || December 15, 2001 || Socorro || LINEAR || NYS || align=right data-sort-value="0.81" | 810 m || 
|-id=749 bgcolor=#fefefe
| 237749 ||  || — || December 15, 2001 || Socorro || LINEAR || — || align=right | 1.1 km || 
|-id=750 bgcolor=#d6d6d6
| 237750 ||  || — || December 15, 2001 || Socorro || LINEAR || HYG || align=right | 5.0 km || 
|-id=751 bgcolor=#d6d6d6
| 237751 ||  || — || December 14, 2001 || Kitt Peak || Spacewatch || — || align=right | 5.6 km || 
|-id=752 bgcolor=#fefefe
| 237752 ||  || — || December 14, 2001 || Kitt Peak || Spacewatch || — || align=right | 1.6 km || 
|-id=753 bgcolor=#fefefe
| 237753 ||  || — || December 14, 2001 || Socorro || LINEAR || NYS || align=right data-sort-value="0.98" | 980 m || 
|-id=754 bgcolor=#d6d6d6
| 237754 ||  || — || December 17, 2001 || Socorro || LINEAR || — || align=right | 3.5 km || 
|-id=755 bgcolor=#fefefe
| 237755 ||  || — || December 18, 2001 || Socorro || LINEAR || MAS || align=right | 1.1 km || 
|-id=756 bgcolor=#E9E9E9
| 237756 ||  || — || December 18, 2001 || Socorro || LINEAR || — || align=right | 1.7 km || 
|-id=757 bgcolor=#fefefe
| 237757 ||  || — || December 17, 2001 || Socorro || LINEAR || — || align=right | 1.3 km || 
|-id=758 bgcolor=#fefefe
| 237758 ||  || — || December 17, 2001 || Socorro || LINEAR || — || align=right | 1.2 km || 
|-id=759 bgcolor=#fefefe
| 237759 ||  || — || December 19, 2001 || Socorro || LINEAR || — || align=right | 1.6 km || 
|-id=760 bgcolor=#fefefe
| 237760 ||  || — || December 22, 2001 || Socorro || LINEAR || — || align=right | 1.1 km || 
|-id=761 bgcolor=#fefefe
| 237761 ||  || — || December 18, 2001 || Socorro || LINEAR || — || align=right | 1.2 km || 
|-id=762 bgcolor=#fefefe
| 237762 ||  || — || January 5, 2002 || Socorro || LINEAR || PHO || align=right | 1.9 km || 
|-id=763 bgcolor=#fefefe
| 237763 ||  || — || January 11, 2002 || Desert Eagle || W. K. Y. Yeung || MAS || align=right | 1.0 km || 
|-id=764 bgcolor=#fefefe
| 237764 ||  || — || January 9, 2002 || Haleakala || NEAT || H || align=right | 1.0 km || 
|-id=765 bgcolor=#fefefe
| 237765 ||  || — || January 7, 2002 || Anderson Mesa || LONEOS || FLO || align=right | 1.2 km || 
|-id=766 bgcolor=#E9E9E9
| 237766 ||  || — || January 8, 2002 || Palomar || NEAT || — || align=right | 1.7 km || 
|-id=767 bgcolor=#fefefe
| 237767 ||  || — || January 9, 2002 || Socorro || LINEAR || — || align=right | 1.1 km || 
|-id=768 bgcolor=#fefefe
| 237768 ||  || — || January 9, 2002 || Socorro || LINEAR || — || align=right | 1.3 km || 
|-id=769 bgcolor=#fefefe
| 237769 ||  || — || January 8, 2002 || Socorro || LINEAR || — || align=right data-sort-value="0.97" | 970 m || 
|-id=770 bgcolor=#fefefe
| 237770 ||  || — || January 8, 2002 || Socorro || LINEAR || NYS || align=right data-sort-value="0.96" | 960 m || 
|-id=771 bgcolor=#fefefe
| 237771 ||  || — || January 8, 2002 || Socorro || LINEAR || MAS || align=right | 1.0 km || 
|-id=772 bgcolor=#fefefe
| 237772 ||  || — || January 9, 2002 || Socorro || LINEAR || V || align=right | 1.1 km || 
|-id=773 bgcolor=#fefefe
| 237773 ||  || — || January 8, 2002 || Socorro || LINEAR || — || align=right | 1.1 km || 
|-id=774 bgcolor=#E9E9E9
| 237774 ||  || — || January 8, 2002 || Socorro || LINEAR || — || align=right | 1.4 km || 
|-id=775 bgcolor=#fefefe
| 237775 ||  || — || January 8, 2002 || Socorro || LINEAR || — || align=right | 1.1 km || 
|-id=776 bgcolor=#fefefe
| 237776 ||  || — || January 9, 2002 || Socorro || LINEAR || NYS || align=right data-sort-value="0.74" | 740 m || 
|-id=777 bgcolor=#E9E9E9
| 237777 ||  || — || January 9, 2002 || Socorro || LINEAR || — || align=right | 1.2 km || 
|-id=778 bgcolor=#fefefe
| 237778 ||  || — || January 9, 2002 || Socorro || LINEAR || — || align=right | 1.7 km || 
|-id=779 bgcolor=#E9E9E9
| 237779 ||  || — || January 9, 2002 || Socorro || LINEAR || — || align=right | 2.5 km || 
|-id=780 bgcolor=#fefefe
| 237780 ||  || — || January 9, 2002 || Socorro || LINEAR || — || align=right | 2.7 km || 
|-id=781 bgcolor=#E9E9E9
| 237781 ||  || — || January 13, 2002 || Socorro || LINEAR || BRG || align=right | 2.2 km || 
|-id=782 bgcolor=#fefefe
| 237782 ||  || — || January 9, 2002 || Socorro || LINEAR || — || align=right | 1.2 km || 
|-id=783 bgcolor=#E9E9E9
| 237783 ||  || — || January 14, 2002 || Socorro || LINEAR || EUN || align=right | 2.3 km || 
|-id=784 bgcolor=#fefefe
| 237784 ||  || — || January 14, 2002 || Socorro || LINEAR || NYS || align=right data-sort-value="0.82" | 820 m || 
|-id=785 bgcolor=#fefefe
| 237785 ||  || — || January 14, 2002 || Socorro || LINEAR || — || align=right | 1.4 km || 
|-id=786 bgcolor=#fefefe
| 237786 ||  || — || January 5, 2002 || Anderson Mesa || LONEOS || — || align=right | 1.1 km || 
|-id=787 bgcolor=#fefefe
| 237787 ||  || — || January 7, 2002 || Anderson Mesa || LONEOS || SUL || align=right | 3.0 km || 
|-id=788 bgcolor=#fefefe
| 237788 ||  || — || January 8, 2002 || Socorro || LINEAR || — || align=right | 1.8 km || 
|-id=789 bgcolor=#fefefe
| 237789 ||  || — || January 19, 2002 || Desert Eagle || W. K. Y. Yeung || — || align=right | 1.5 km || 
|-id=790 bgcolor=#E9E9E9
| 237790 ||  || — || January 19, 2002 || Socorro || LINEAR || — || align=right | 1.7 km || 
|-id=791 bgcolor=#fefefe
| 237791 ||  || — || January 20, 2002 || Kitt Peak || Spacewatch || — || align=right data-sort-value="0.91" | 910 m || 
|-id=792 bgcolor=#fefefe
| 237792 ||  || — || January 21, 2002 || Kitt Peak || Spacewatch || V || align=right data-sort-value="0.92" | 920 m || 
|-id=793 bgcolor=#fefefe
| 237793 ||  || — || January 18, 2002 || Socorro || LINEAR || V || align=right | 1.3 km || 
|-id=794 bgcolor=#fefefe
| 237794 ||  || — || January 19, 2002 || Socorro || LINEAR || — || align=right | 2.8 km || 
|-id=795 bgcolor=#fefefe
| 237795 ||  || — || January 21, 2002 || Socorro || LINEAR || MAS || align=right data-sort-value="0.94" | 940 m || 
|-id=796 bgcolor=#fefefe
| 237796 ||  || — || January 21, 2002 || Eskridge || G. Hug || ERI || align=right | 2.9 km || 
|-id=797 bgcolor=#fefefe
| 237797 ||  || — || January 26, 2002 || Socorro || LINEAR || H || align=right data-sort-value="0.88" | 880 m || 
|-id=798 bgcolor=#E9E9E9
| 237798 ||  || — || January 19, 2002 || Socorro || LINEAR || ADE || align=right | 3.4 km || 
|-id=799 bgcolor=#E9E9E9
| 237799 ||  || — || February 3, 2002 || Palomar || NEAT || — || align=right | 1.3 km || 
|-id=800 bgcolor=#fefefe
| 237800 ||  || — || February 6, 2002 || Socorro || LINEAR || H || align=right data-sort-value="0.99" | 990 m || 
|}

237801–237900 

|-bgcolor=#fefefe
| 237801 ||  || — || February 6, 2002 || Socorro || LINEAR || H || align=right | 1.0 km || 
|-id=802 bgcolor=#fefefe
| 237802 ||  || — || February 6, 2002 || Socorro || LINEAR || H || align=right | 1.0 km || 
|-id=803 bgcolor=#E9E9E9
| 237803 ||  || — || February 4, 2002 || Palomar || NEAT || — || align=right | 2.5 km || 
|-id=804 bgcolor=#fefefe
| 237804 ||  || — || February 6, 2002 || Haleakala || NEAT || — || align=right | 1.2 km || 
|-id=805 bgcolor=#FFC2E0
| 237805 ||  || — || February 10, 2002 || Socorro || LINEAR || AMO +1km || align=right data-sort-value="0.7" | 700 m || 
|-id=806 bgcolor=#fefefe
| 237806 ||  || — || February 10, 2002 || Socorro || LINEAR || H || align=right data-sort-value="0.68" | 680 m || 
|-id=807 bgcolor=#E9E9E9
| 237807 ||  || — || February 7, 2002 || Socorro || LINEAR || — || align=right | 2.8 km || 
|-id=808 bgcolor=#fefefe
| 237808 ||  || — || February 7, 2002 || Socorro || LINEAR || — || align=right | 1.2 km || 
|-id=809 bgcolor=#fefefe
| 237809 ||  || — || February 7, 2002 || Socorro || LINEAR || — || align=right data-sort-value="0.79" | 790 m || 
|-id=810 bgcolor=#fefefe
| 237810 ||  || — || February 7, 2002 || Socorro || LINEAR || MAS || align=right | 1.1 km || 
|-id=811 bgcolor=#fefefe
| 237811 ||  || — || February 7, 2002 || Socorro || LINEAR || MAS || align=right data-sort-value="0.98" | 980 m || 
|-id=812 bgcolor=#fefefe
| 237812 ||  || — || February 7, 2002 || Socorro || LINEAR || — || align=right | 1.2 km || 
|-id=813 bgcolor=#fefefe
| 237813 ||  || — || February 7, 2002 || Socorro || LINEAR || — || align=right | 1.3 km || 
|-id=814 bgcolor=#E9E9E9
| 237814 ||  || — || February 7, 2002 || Socorro || LINEAR || — || align=right | 1.5 km || 
|-id=815 bgcolor=#fefefe
| 237815 ||  || — || February 7, 2002 || Socorro || LINEAR || — || align=right | 1.3 km || 
|-id=816 bgcolor=#E9E9E9
| 237816 ||  || — || February 7, 2002 || Socorro || LINEAR || — || align=right | 1.3 km || 
|-id=817 bgcolor=#fefefe
| 237817 ||  || — || February 7, 2002 || Socorro || LINEAR || V || align=right data-sort-value="0.99" | 990 m || 
|-id=818 bgcolor=#E9E9E9
| 237818 ||  || — || February 8, 2002 || Socorro || LINEAR || MIT || align=right | 3.3 km || 
|-id=819 bgcolor=#fefefe
| 237819 ||  || — || February 7, 2002 || Socorro || LINEAR || MAS || align=right data-sort-value="0.86" | 860 m || 
|-id=820 bgcolor=#fefefe
| 237820 ||  || — || February 7, 2002 || Socorro || LINEAR || — || align=right data-sort-value="0.91" | 910 m || 
|-id=821 bgcolor=#E9E9E9
| 237821 ||  || — || February 8, 2002 || Socorro || LINEAR || — || align=right | 1.3 km || 
|-id=822 bgcolor=#d6d6d6
| 237822 ||  || — || February 10, 2002 || Socorro || LINEAR || SYL7:4 || align=right | 6.9 km || 
|-id=823 bgcolor=#fefefe
| 237823 ||  || — || February 10, 2002 || Socorro || LINEAR || — || align=right data-sort-value="0.98" | 980 m || 
|-id=824 bgcolor=#E9E9E9
| 237824 ||  || — || February 10, 2002 || Socorro || LINEAR || — || align=right | 3.3 km || 
|-id=825 bgcolor=#fefefe
| 237825 ||  || — || February 10, 2002 || Socorro || LINEAR || — || align=right | 1.0 km || 
|-id=826 bgcolor=#fefefe
| 237826 ||  || — || February 10, 2002 || Socorro || LINEAR || — || align=right data-sort-value="0.93" | 930 m || 
|-id=827 bgcolor=#E9E9E9
| 237827 ||  || — || February 10, 2002 || Socorro || LINEAR || — || align=right | 2.5 km || 
|-id=828 bgcolor=#fefefe
| 237828 ||  || — || February 10, 2002 || Socorro || LINEAR || MAS || align=right | 1.1 km || 
|-id=829 bgcolor=#fefefe
| 237829 ||  || — || February 10, 2002 || Socorro || LINEAR || V || align=right data-sort-value="0.89" | 890 m || 
|-id=830 bgcolor=#fefefe
| 237830 ||  || — || February 6, 2002 || Anderson Mesa || LONEOS || — || align=right | 1.4 km || 
|-id=831 bgcolor=#fefefe
| 237831 ||  || — || February 11, 2002 || Socorro || LINEAR || V || align=right data-sort-value="0.88" | 880 m || 
|-id=832 bgcolor=#fefefe
| 237832 ||  || — || February 8, 2002 || Socorro || LINEAR || — || align=right | 1.2 km || 
|-id=833 bgcolor=#fefefe
| 237833 ||  || — || February 6, 2002 || Palomar || NEAT || — || align=right | 1.6 km || 
|-id=834 bgcolor=#E9E9E9
| 237834 ||  || — || February 22, 2002 || Socorro || LINEAR || BAR || align=right | 1.8 km || 
|-id=835 bgcolor=#E9E9E9
| 237835 ||  || — || February 21, 2002 || Anderson Mesa || LONEOS || HNS || align=right | 1.9 km || 
|-id=836 bgcolor=#fefefe
| 237836 ||  || — || March 10, 2002 || Nashville || R. Clingan || V || align=right | 1.3 km || 
|-id=837 bgcolor=#E9E9E9
| 237837 ||  || — || March 13, 2002 || Socorro || LINEAR || — || align=right | 5.4 km || 
|-id=838 bgcolor=#d6d6d6
| 237838 ||  || — || March 13, 2002 || Socorro || LINEAR || Tj (2.91) || align=right | 5.6 km || 
|-id=839 bgcolor=#E9E9E9
| 237839 ||  || — || March 5, 2002 || Anderson Mesa || LONEOS || KON || align=right | 3.3 km || 
|-id=840 bgcolor=#E9E9E9
| 237840 ||  || — || March 12, 2002 || Palomar || NEAT || — || align=right data-sort-value="0.94" | 940 m || 
|-id=841 bgcolor=#fefefe
| 237841 ||  || — || March 12, 2002 || Palomar || NEAT || — || align=right | 1.5 km || 
|-id=842 bgcolor=#E9E9E9
| 237842 ||  || — || March 15, 2002 || Palomar || NEAT || — || align=right | 4.0 km || 
|-id=843 bgcolor=#E9E9E9
| 237843 ||  || — || March 5, 2002 || Palomar || NEAT || ADE || align=right | 3.1 km || 
|-id=844 bgcolor=#fefefe
| 237844 ||  || — || March 20, 2002 || Socorro || LINEAR || H || align=right data-sort-value="0.73" | 730 m || 
|-id=845 bgcolor=#E9E9E9
| 237845 Neris ||  ||  || March 16, 2002 || Moletai || K. Černis, J. Zdanavičius || — || align=right | 2.8 km || 
|-id=846 bgcolor=#E9E9E9
| 237846 ||  || — || March 19, 2002 || Palomar || NEAT || — || align=right | 3.6 km || 
|-id=847 bgcolor=#fefefe
| 237847 ||  || — || March 20, 2002 || Anderson Mesa || LONEOS || — || align=right | 1.4 km || 
|-id=848 bgcolor=#fefefe
| 237848 ||  || — || April 14, 2002 || Socorro || LINEAR || H || align=right data-sort-value="0.82" | 820 m || 
|-id=849 bgcolor=#d6d6d6
| 237849 ||  || — || April 4, 2002 || Palomar || NEAT || 3:2 || align=right | 8.5 km || 
|-id=850 bgcolor=#fefefe
| 237850 ||  || — || April 8, 2002 || Palomar || NEAT || — || align=right | 2.8 km || 
|-id=851 bgcolor=#E9E9E9
| 237851 ||  || — || April 9, 2002 || Anderson Mesa || LONEOS || PAD || align=right | 3.6 km || 
|-id=852 bgcolor=#E9E9E9
| 237852 ||  || — || April 9, 2002 || Anderson Mesa || LONEOS || — || align=right | 1.9 km || 
|-id=853 bgcolor=#fefefe
| 237853 ||  || — || April 9, 2002 || Socorro || LINEAR || — || align=right | 2.7 km || 
|-id=854 bgcolor=#E9E9E9
| 237854 ||  || — || April 11, 2002 || Anderson Mesa || LONEOS || EUN || align=right | 1.5 km || 
|-id=855 bgcolor=#E9E9E9
| 237855 ||  || — || April 11, 2002 || Socorro || LINEAR || — || align=right | 1.2 km || 
|-id=856 bgcolor=#E9E9E9
| 237856 ||  || — || April 11, 2002 || Socorro || LINEAR || — || align=right | 2.5 km || 
|-id=857 bgcolor=#E9E9E9
| 237857 ||  || — || April 12, 2002 || Palomar || NEAT || — || align=right | 1.5 km || 
|-id=858 bgcolor=#d6d6d6
| 237858 ||  || — || April 12, 2002 || Socorro || LINEAR || 3:2 || align=right | 8.6 km || 
|-id=859 bgcolor=#E9E9E9
| 237859 ||  || — || April 12, 2002 || Socorro || LINEAR || — || align=right | 1.5 km || 
|-id=860 bgcolor=#E9E9E9
| 237860 ||  || — || April 12, 2002 || Socorro || LINEAR || — || align=right | 1.2 km || 
|-id=861 bgcolor=#d6d6d6
| 237861 ||  || — || April 12, 2002 || Socorro || LINEAR || SHU3:2 || align=right | 5.7 km || 
|-id=862 bgcolor=#E9E9E9
| 237862 ||  || — || April 12, 2002 || Socorro || LINEAR || — || align=right | 1.5 km || 
|-id=863 bgcolor=#E9E9E9
| 237863 ||  || — || April 14, 2002 || Palomar || NEAT || — || align=right | 2.4 km || 
|-id=864 bgcolor=#E9E9E9
| 237864 ||  || — || April 16, 2002 || Socorro || LINEAR || EUN || align=right | 1.8 km || 
|-id=865 bgcolor=#fefefe
| 237865 ||  || — || April 16, 2002 || Socorro || LINEAR || H || align=right data-sort-value="0.80" | 800 m || 
|-id=866 bgcolor=#E9E9E9
| 237866 ||  || — || May 5, 2002 || Palomar || NEAT || — || align=right | 2.4 km || 
|-id=867 bgcolor=#fefefe
| 237867 ||  || — || May 6, 2002 || Socorro || LINEAR || H || align=right | 1.3 km || 
|-id=868 bgcolor=#E9E9E9
| 237868 ||  || — || May 8, 2002 || Desert Eagle || W. K. Y. Yeung || — || align=right | 2.8 km || 
|-id=869 bgcolor=#fefefe
| 237869 ||  || — || May 9, 2002 || Socorro || LINEAR || H || align=right | 1.1 km || 
|-id=870 bgcolor=#E9E9E9
| 237870 ||  || — || May 9, 2002 || Palomar || NEAT || — || align=right | 1.4 km || 
|-id=871 bgcolor=#E9E9E9
| 237871 ||  || — || May 11, 2002 || Socorro || LINEAR || — || align=right | 3.2 km || 
|-id=872 bgcolor=#E9E9E9
| 237872 ||  || — || May 9, 2002 || Socorro || LINEAR || RAF || align=right | 1.6 km || 
|-id=873 bgcolor=#E9E9E9
| 237873 ||  || — || May 13, 2002 || Socorro || LINEAR || — || align=right | 4.1 km || 
|-id=874 bgcolor=#E9E9E9
| 237874 ||  || — || May 11, 2002 || Palomar || NEAT || — || align=right | 4.5 km || 
|-id=875 bgcolor=#E9E9E9
| 237875 ||  || — || May 1, 2002 || Palomar || NEAT || — || align=right | 1.8 km || 
|-id=876 bgcolor=#E9E9E9
| 237876 ||  || — || May 5, 2002 || Palomar || NEAT || EUN || align=right | 1.7 km || 
|-id=877 bgcolor=#E9E9E9
| 237877 ||  || — || May 9, 2002 || Palomar || NEAT || RAF || align=right | 1.5 km || 
|-id=878 bgcolor=#E9E9E9
| 237878 ||  || — || May 13, 2002 || Palomar || NEAT || — || align=right | 3.3 km || 
|-id=879 bgcolor=#E9E9E9
| 237879 ||  || — || May 29, 2002 || Haleakala || NEAT || — || align=right | 1.6 km || 
|-id=880 bgcolor=#fefefe
| 237880 ||  || — || May 17, 2002 || Socorro || LINEAR || H || align=right data-sort-value="0.85" | 850 m || 
|-id=881 bgcolor=#FA8072
| 237881 ||  || — || June 3, 2002 || Socorro || LINEAR || — || align=right | 1.9 km || 
|-id=882 bgcolor=#E9E9E9
| 237882 ||  || — || June 5, 2002 || Socorro || LINEAR || — || align=right | 1.4 km || 
|-id=883 bgcolor=#E9E9E9
| 237883 ||  || — || June 5, 2002 || Socorro || LINEAR || — || align=right | 1.3 km || 
|-id=884 bgcolor=#fefefe
| 237884 ||  || — || June 8, 2002 || Socorro || LINEAR || H || align=right data-sort-value="0.87" | 870 m || 
|-id=885 bgcolor=#E9E9E9
| 237885 ||  || — || June 9, 2002 || Desert Eagle || W. K. Y. Yeung || — || align=right | 4.5 km || 
|-id=886 bgcolor=#E9E9E9
| 237886 ||  || — || June 9, 2002 || Socorro || LINEAR || MIT || align=right | 3.8 km || 
|-id=887 bgcolor=#E9E9E9
| 237887 ||  || — || June 5, 2002 || Palomar || NEAT || — || align=right | 2.0 km || 
|-id=888 bgcolor=#fefefe
| 237888 ||  || — || June 15, 2002 || Palomar || NEAT || H || align=right data-sort-value="0.76" | 760 m || 
|-id=889 bgcolor=#E9E9E9
| 237889 ||  || — || June 8, 2002 || Socorro || LINEAR || — || align=right | 3.1 km || 
|-id=890 bgcolor=#E9E9E9
| 237890 ||  || — || June 12, 2002 || Socorro || LINEAR || ADE || align=right | 3.0 km || 
|-id=891 bgcolor=#E9E9E9
| 237891 ||  || — || June 12, 2002 || Palomar || NEAT || — || align=right | 2.2 km || 
|-id=892 bgcolor=#E9E9E9
| 237892 ||  || — || July 4, 2002 || Palomar || NEAT || — || align=right | 2.8 km || 
|-id=893 bgcolor=#E9E9E9
| 237893 ||  || — || July 13, 2002 || Socorro || LINEAR || — || align=right | 2.6 km || 
|-id=894 bgcolor=#E9E9E9
| 237894 ||  || — || July 14, 2002 || Socorro || LINEAR || JUN || align=right | 2.3 km || 
|-id=895 bgcolor=#E9E9E9
| 237895 ||  || — || July 13, 2002 || Palomar || NEAT || — || align=right | 1.8 km || 
|-id=896 bgcolor=#E9E9E9
| 237896 ||  || — || July 14, 2002 || Socorro || LINEAR || — || align=right | 2.0 km || 
|-id=897 bgcolor=#E9E9E9
| 237897 ||  || — || July 4, 2002 || Palomar || S. F. Hönig || EUN || align=right | 1.7 km || 
|-id=898 bgcolor=#E9E9E9
| 237898 ||  || — || July 2, 2002 || Palomar || NEAT || — || align=right | 1.9 km || 
|-id=899 bgcolor=#E9E9E9
| 237899 ||  || — || July 14, 2002 || Palomar || NEAT || PAD || align=right | 2.8 km || 
|-id=900 bgcolor=#d6d6d6
| 237900 ||  || — || July 12, 2002 || Palomar || NEAT || — || align=right | 5.2 km || 
|}

237901–238000 

|-bgcolor=#E9E9E9
| 237901 ||  || — || July 20, 2002 || Palomar || NEAT || EUN || align=right | 1.8 km || 
|-id=902 bgcolor=#E9E9E9
| 237902 ||  || — || July 18, 2002 || Socorro || LINEAR || — || align=right | 2.0 km || 
|-id=903 bgcolor=#d6d6d6
| 237903 ||  || — || July 18, 2002 || Socorro || LINEAR || — || align=right | 6.5 km || 
|-id=904 bgcolor=#E9E9E9
| 237904 ||  || — || August 6, 2002 || Palomar || NEAT || — || align=right | 2.3 km || 
|-id=905 bgcolor=#E9E9E9
| 237905 ||  || — || August 5, 2002 || Palomar || NEAT || — || align=right | 2.4 km || 
|-id=906 bgcolor=#fefefe
| 237906 ||  || — || August 11, 2002 || Socorro || LINEAR || H || align=right | 1.3 km || 
|-id=907 bgcolor=#E9E9E9
| 237907 ||  || — || August 8, 2002 || Palomar || NEAT || JUN || align=right | 1.4 km || 
|-id=908 bgcolor=#E9E9E9
| 237908 ||  || — || August 5, 2002 || Socorro || LINEAR || — || align=right | 4.6 km || 
|-id=909 bgcolor=#E9E9E9
| 237909 ||  || — || August 9, 2002 || Socorro || LINEAR || POS || align=right | 5.2 km || 
|-id=910 bgcolor=#E9E9E9
| 237910 ||  || — || August 11, 2002 || Socorro || LINEAR || JUN || align=right | 1.7 km || 
|-id=911 bgcolor=#E9E9E9
| 237911 ||  || — || August 11, 2002 || Socorro || LINEAR || — || align=right | 4.2 km || 
|-id=912 bgcolor=#E9E9E9
| 237912 ||  || — || August 11, 2002 || Haleakala || NEAT || — || align=right | 2.1 km || 
|-id=913 bgcolor=#E9E9E9
| 237913 ||  || — || August 11, 2002 || Socorro || LINEAR || — || align=right | 3.8 km || 
|-id=914 bgcolor=#E9E9E9
| 237914 ||  || — || August 12, 2002 || Socorro || LINEAR || — || align=right | 2.2 km || 
|-id=915 bgcolor=#E9E9E9
| 237915 ||  || — || August 12, 2002 || Socorro || LINEAR || — || align=right | 3.0 km || 
|-id=916 bgcolor=#E9E9E9
| 237916 ||  || — || August 13, 2002 || Socorro || LINEAR || — || align=right | 1.5 km || 
|-id=917 bgcolor=#d6d6d6
| 237917 ||  || — || August 13, 2002 || Anderson Mesa || LONEOS || — || align=right | 7.1 km || 
|-id=918 bgcolor=#E9E9E9
| 237918 ||  || — || August 13, 2002 || Anderson Mesa || LONEOS || NEM || align=right | 3.1 km || 
|-id=919 bgcolor=#E9E9E9
| 237919 ||  || — || August 14, 2002 || Palomar || NEAT || — || align=right | 4.2 km || 
|-id=920 bgcolor=#E9E9E9
| 237920 ||  || — || August 8, 2002 || Palomar || NEAT || — || align=right | 2.2 km || 
|-id=921 bgcolor=#E9E9E9
| 237921 ||  || — || August 8, 2002 || Palomar || NEAT || HOF || align=right | 3.9 km || 
|-id=922 bgcolor=#E9E9E9
| 237922 ||  || — || August 15, 2002 || Palomar || NEAT || HOF || align=right | 3.5 km || 
|-id=923 bgcolor=#E9E9E9
| 237923 ||  || — || August 11, 2002 || Palomar || NEAT || HOF || align=right | 2.5 km || 
|-id=924 bgcolor=#E9E9E9
| 237924 ||  || — || August 5, 2002 || Palomar || NEAT || — || align=right | 1.7 km || 
|-id=925 bgcolor=#E9E9E9
| 237925 ||  || — || August 8, 2002 || Palomar || NEAT || — || align=right | 2.3 km || 
|-id=926 bgcolor=#E9E9E9
| 237926 ||  || — || August 11, 2002 || Palomar || NEAT || AGN || align=right | 1.3 km || 
|-id=927 bgcolor=#E9E9E9
| 237927 ||  || — || August 11, 2002 || Palomar || NEAT || PAD || align=right | 3.0 km || 
|-id=928 bgcolor=#E9E9E9
| 237928 ||  || — || August 7, 2002 || Palomar || NEAT || AGN || align=right | 1.4 km || 
|-id=929 bgcolor=#E9E9E9
| 237929 ||  || — || August 26, 2002 || Palomar || NEAT || KON || align=right | 4.0 km || 
|-id=930 bgcolor=#d6d6d6
| 237930 ||  || — || August 26, 2002 || Palomar || NEAT || — || align=right | 4.2 km || 
|-id=931 bgcolor=#E9E9E9
| 237931 ||  || — || August 28, 2002 || Palomar || NEAT || — || align=right | 2.5 km || 
|-id=932 bgcolor=#E9E9E9
| 237932 ||  || — || August 16, 2002 || Palomar || A. Lowe || NEM || align=right | 3.0 km || 
|-id=933 bgcolor=#d6d6d6
| 237933 ||  || — || August 29, 2002 || Palomar || S. F. Hönig || KOR || align=right | 1.7 km || 
|-id=934 bgcolor=#E9E9E9
| 237934 ||  || — || August 19, 2002 || Palomar || NEAT || AGN || align=right | 1.7 km || 
|-id=935 bgcolor=#E9E9E9
| 237935 ||  || — || August 17, 2002 || Palomar || NEAT || — || align=right | 3.0 km || 
|-id=936 bgcolor=#d6d6d6
| 237936 ||  || — || August 27, 2002 || Palomar || NEAT || KOR || align=right | 1.7 km || 
|-id=937 bgcolor=#E9E9E9
| 237937 ||  || — || August 17, 2002 || Palomar || NEAT || HOF || align=right | 4.0 km || 
|-id=938 bgcolor=#E9E9E9
| 237938 ||  || — || August 29, 2002 || Palomar || NEAT || GEF || align=right | 1.5 km || 
|-id=939 bgcolor=#d6d6d6
| 237939 ||  || — || August 19, 2002 || Palomar || NEAT || — || align=right | 2.8 km || 
|-id=940 bgcolor=#E9E9E9
| 237940 ||  || — || August 18, 2002 || Palomar || NEAT || WIT || align=right | 1.3 km || 
|-id=941 bgcolor=#E9E9E9
| 237941 ||  || — || August 20, 2002 || Palomar || NEAT || — || align=right | 2.1 km || 
|-id=942 bgcolor=#E9E9E9
| 237942 ||  || — || August 18, 2002 || Palomar || NEAT || — || align=right | 2.5 km || 
|-id=943 bgcolor=#E9E9E9
| 237943 ||  || — || August 18, 2002 || Palomar || NEAT || — || align=right | 2.8 km || 
|-id=944 bgcolor=#E9E9E9
| 237944 ||  || — || September 4, 2002 || Palomar || NEAT || — || align=right | 3.3 km || 
|-id=945 bgcolor=#E9E9E9
| 237945 ||  || — || September 4, 2002 || Anderson Mesa || LONEOS || JUN || align=right | 1.9 km || 
|-id=946 bgcolor=#E9E9E9
| 237946 ||  || — || September 3, 2002 || Haleakala || NEAT || — || align=right | 3.3 km || 
|-id=947 bgcolor=#E9E9E9
| 237947 ||  || — || September 4, 2002 || Anderson Mesa || LONEOS || — || align=right | 4.2 km || 
|-id=948 bgcolor=#d6d6d6
| 237948 ||  || — || September 4, 2002 || Anderson Mesa || LONEOS || EOS || align=right | 2.8 km || 
|-id=949 bgcolor=#E9E9E9
| 237949 ||  || — || September 5, 2002 || Anderson Mesa || LONEOS || ADE || align=right | 2.9 km || 
|-id=950 bgcolor=#E9E9E9
| 237950 ||  || — || September 5, 2002 || Anderson Mesa || LONEOS || — || align=right | 3.6 km || 
|-id=951 bgcolor=#E9E9E9
| 237951 ||  || — || September 5, 2002 || Socorro || LINEAR || — || align=right | 3.4 km || 
|-id=952 bgcolor=#E9E9E9
| 237952 ||  || — || September 5, 2002 || Anderson Mesa || LONEOS || — || align=right | 3.0 km || 
|-id=953 bgcolor=#E9E9E9
| 237953 ||  || — || September 4, 2002 || Anderson Mesa || LONEOS || — || align=right | 4.5 km || 
|-id=954 bgcolor=#E9E9E9
| 237954 ||  || — || September 5, 2002 || Socorro || LINEAR || — || align=right | 2.9 km || 
|-id=955 bgcolor=#E9E9E9
| 237955 ||  || — || September 5, 2002 || Socorro || LINEAR || GEF || align=right | 1.8 km || 
|-id=956 bgcolor=#d6d6d6
| 237956 ||  || — || September 5, 2002 || Socorro || LINEAR || EOS || align=right | 3.4 km || 
|-id=957 bgcolor=#d6d6d6
| 237957 ||  || — || September 5, 2002 || Socorro || LINEAR || — || align=right | 3.7 km || 
|-id=958 bgcolor=#d6d6d6
| 237958 ||  || — || September 6, 2002 || Socorro || LINEAR || — || align=right | 6.6 km || 
|-id=959 bgcolor=#E9E9E9
| 237959 ||  || — || September 6, 2002 || Nashville || R. Clingan || — || align=right | 2.4 km || 
|-id=960 bgcolor=#E9E9E9
| 237960 ||  || — || September 9, 2002 || Haleakala || NEAT || — || align=right | 4.7 km || 
|-id=961 bgcolor=#E9E9E9
| 237961 ||  || — || September 11, 2002 || Haleakala || NEAT || — || align=right | 3.7 km || 
|-id=962 bgcolor=#d6d6d6
| 237962 ||  || — || September 11, 2002 || Palomar || NEAT || — || align=right | 3.9 km || 
|-id=963 bgcolor=#d6d6d6
| 237963 ||  || — || September 11, 2002 || Palomar || NEAT || — || align=right | 6.7 km || 
|-id=964 bgcolor=#E9E9E9
| 237964 ||  || — || September 12, 2002 || Palomar || NEAT || — || align=right | 4.5 km || 
|-id=965 bgcolor=#d6d6d6
| 237965 ||  || — || September 12, 2002 || Palomar || NEAT || 628 || align=right | 2.7 km || 
|-id=966 bgcolor=#E9E9E9
| 237966 ||  || — || September 12, 2002 || Palomar || NEAT || — || align=right | 2.6 km || 
|-id=967 bgcolor=#E9E9E9
| 237967 ||  || — || September 13, 2002 || Palomar || NEAT || — || align=right | 3.1 km || 
|-id=968 bgcolor=#d6d6d6
| 237968 ||  || — || September 13, 2002 || Palomar || NEAT || CHA || align=right | 2.5 km || 
|-id=969 bgcolor=#d6d6d6
| 237969 ||  || — || September 12, 2002 || Haleakala || NEAT || — || align=right | 4.6 km || 
|-id=970 bgcolor=#E9E9E9
| 237970 ||  || — || September 14, 2002 || Haleakala || NEAT || — || align=right | 3.1 km || 
|-id=971 bgcolor=#d6d6d6
| 237971 ||  || — || September 14, 2002 || Haleakala || NEAT || — || align=right | 3.5 km || 
|-id=972 bgcolor=#d6d6d6
| 237972 ||  || — || September 14, 2002 || Haleakala || NEAT || CHA || align=right | 3.3 km || 
|-id=973 bgcolor=#d6d6d6
| 237973 ||  || — || September 15, 2002 || Palomar || NEAT || KOR || align=right | 1.9 km || 
|-id=974 bgcolor=#E9E9E9
| 237974 ||  || — || September 13, 2002 || Palomar || NEAT || — || align=right | 3.1 km || 
|-id=975 bgcolor=#d6d6d6
| 237975 ||  || — || September 14, 2002 || Palomar || NEAT || — || align=right | 2.8 km || 
|-id=976 bgcolor=#E9E9E9
| 237976 ||  || — || September 14, 2002 || Haleakala || NEAT || — || align=right | 2.7 km || 
|-id=977 bgcolor=#E9E9E9
| 237977 ||  || — || September 15, 2002 || Palomar || R. Matson || — || align=right | 2.9 km || 
|-id=978 bgcolor=#d6d6d6
| 237978 ||  || — || September 14, 2002 || Palomar || NEAT || KOR || align=right | 1.7 km || 
|-id=979 bgcolor=#d6d6d6
| 237979 ||  || — || September 8, 2002 || Haleakala || NEAT || — || align=right | 3.4 km || 
|-id=980 bgcolor=#d6d6d6
| 237980 ||  || — || September 14, 2002 || Palomar || NEAT || THM || align=right | 2.4 km || 
|-id=981 bgcolor=#E9E9E9
| 237981 ||  || — || September 15, 2002 || Palomar || NEAT || — || align=right | 2.9 km || 
|-id=982 bgcolor=#d6d6d6
| 237982 ||  || — || September 4, 2002 || Palomar || NEAT || KOR || align=right | 1.5 km || 
|-id=983 bgcolor=#d6d6d6
| 237983 ||  || — || September 26, 2002 || Palomar || NEAT || — || align=right | 4.3 km || 
|-id=984 bgcolor=#d6d6d6
| 237984 ||  || — || September 27, 2002 || Palomar || NEAT || ALA || align=right | 6.4 km || 
|-id=985 bgcolor=#d6d6d6
| 237985 ||  || — || September 26, 2002 || Palomar || NEAT || TIR || align=right | 3.3 km || 
|-id=986 bgcolor=#E9E9E9
| 237986 ||  || — || September 28, 2002 || Haleakala || NEAT || — || align=right | 4.7 km || 
|-id=987 bgcolor=#d6d6d6
| 237987 ||  || — || September 26, 2002 || Palomar || NEAT || THB || align=right | 3.7 km || 
|-id=988 bgcolor=#E9E9E9
| 237988 ||  || — || September 29, 2002 || Haleakala || NEAT || — || align=right | 2.9 km || 
|-id=989 bgcolor=#d6d6d6
| 237989 ||  || — || September 29, 2002 || Haleakala || NEAT || — || align=right | 4.9 km || 
|-id=990 bgcolor=#E9E9E9
| 237990 ||  || — || September 29, 2002 || Haleakala || NEAT || — || align=right | 2.6 km || 
|-id=991 bgcolor=#d6d6d6
| 237991 ||  || — || September 17, 2002 || Palomar || NEAT || EOS || align=right | 3.1 km || 
|-id=992 bgcolor=#d6d6d6
| 237992 ||  || — || September 17, 2002 || Palomar || NEAT || — || align=right | 4.3 km || 
|-id=993 bgcolor=#E9E9E9
| 237993 ||  || — || September 30, 2002 || Socorro || LINEAR || GEF || align=right | 2.0 km || 
|-id=994 bgcolor=#E9E9E9
| 237994 ||  || — || September 16, 2002 || Palomar || NEAT || NEM || align=right | 2.4 km || 
|-id=995 bgcolor=#E9E9E9
| 237995 ||  || — || September 16, 2002 || Palomar || NEAT || HOF || align=right | 4.2 km || 
|-id=996 bgcolor=#d6d6d6
| 237996 ||  || — || September 16, 2002 || Palomar || NEAT || — || align=right | 3.9 km || 
|-id=997 bgcolor=#d6d6d6
| 237997 ||  || — || October 2, 2002 || Socorro || LINEAR || — || align=right | 6.8 km || 
|-id=998 bgcolor=#d6d6d6
| 237998 ||  || — || October 2, 2002 || Socorro || LINEAR || EUP || align=right | 5.2 km || 
|-id=999 bgcolor=#E9E9E9
| 237999 ||  || — || October 2, 2002 || Haleakala || NEAT || — || align=right | 3.3 km || 
|-id=000 bgcolor=#d6d6d6
| 238000 ||  || — || October 3, 2002 || Campo Imperatore || CINEOS || — || align=right | 4.6 km || 
|}

References

External links 
 Discovery Circumstances: Numbered Minor Planets (235001)–(240000) (IAU Minor Planet Center)

0237